This list of British Jewish entertainers includes entertainers (actors, directors, screenwriters, musicians, film makers and others, including well known writers, social reformers, journalists, intellectuals, painters, photographers, fashion designers, sculptors, entrepreneurs and creative artists) from the United Kingdom and its predecessor states who are or were Jewish. The number of Jews contributing to British cinema increased after 1933, when Jews were prohibited from working in Nazi Germany. In the early 1930s, the Imperial Fascist League's anti-semitic newspaper The Fascist sought to isolate the Jews in British cinema.

In the 1970s, TV scripts by British-Jewish playwright Jack Rosenthal called Bar Mitzvah Boy and The Evacuees were praised as "unprecedented British-Jewish depictions". Stephen Brook wrote in The Club in 1989 that while there had been Jewish actors in British theatre, Jews had been more prominent as producers or agents. The Independent observed that British-Jewish comedians had taken the lead from American-Jewish comedian Jackie Mason by laughing at their own Jewish neuroses, Jewish mothers, and their leaning towards chicken soup and chopped liver, which they would not have done a decade prior. By the year 2000, British-Jewish comics may have reached their largest numbers.

Actors

Gabrielle Anwar, of Indian Muslim and Austrian Jewish ancestry, daughter of Tariq Anwar (film editor).
Bennett Arron (born 1973), actor, writer, and comedian
Jacob Adler (1855–1926), Yiddish actor
Peggy Ashcroft (1907–1991)
Jill Balcon, (3 January 1925 – 18 July 2009) was a British actress of Lithuanian Jewish ancestry, and mother of Daniel Day-Lewis. 
Ben Barnes (born 1981), actor
Sacha Baron Cohen (born 1971),was a member of the Cambridge University Amateur Dramatic Club, where he performed in shows such as Fiddler on the Roof and Cyrano de Bergerac, as well as in Habonim Dror, a Labour Zionist youth movement; comedian and actor known for playing the comedic characters Ali G, Brüno, and Borat, the latter of whom is portrayed as extremely antisemitic
Alfie Bass (1916–1987), actor
Gina Bellman (born 1966), actress
John Bennett (1928–2005), actor
Inez Bensusan (1871–1967), Jewish actress, playwright and suffragette in the UK. She was a leader of the Actresses' Franchise League and the Jewish League for Woman Suffrage.
Harold Berens (born Isadore Harold Berenbaum; 4 March 1903 – 10 May 1995); British comedian and character actor who appeared in St Trinian's School, The Pink Panther and Carry On (franchise) films.
Elisabeth Bergner (22 August 1897 – 12 May 1986) was an Austrian Jewish British actress. 
Steven Berkoff (born 1937), actor, writer, and director
Ivan Berlyn (1867 – 11 December 1934); English actor of stage and silent film whose career spanned four decades.
Peter Birrel (born Cohen; 19 July 1935 – 23 June 2004); English actor who played numerous parts on British television for nearly forty years; appeared in the Doctor Who.
Lionel Blair (1931–2021), TV entertainer
Claire Bloom, Russian Jewish ancestry (born 1931); known for leading roles in A Streetcar Named Desire (play), A Doll's House, and Long Day's Journey into Night, and has starred in nearly sixty films. She is one of the last surviving stars from the Golden Age of Hollywood.
John Bluthal, (born Isaac Bluthal; 12 August 1929 – 15 November 2018) was a Polish Jewish born Australian actor, moved to the United Kingdom permanently in 1960, noted for his six-decade career internationally in Australia, the United Kingdom and the United States.
Helena Bonham Carter (born 1966), actress
Josh Bowman (born 1988), actor
Bernard Bresslaw (1934–1993), actor and comedian
Eleanor Bron (born 1938), actress and writer
June Brown  (16 February 1927 – 3 April 2022) was an English actress and author of Sephardic Jewish ancestry; best known for her role as Dot Cotton on the BBC soap opera EastEnders (1985–1993; 1997–2020).
Katrin Cartlidge (1961–2002), actress
Maria Charles (born 22 September 1929), English film, television and stage actress, director and comedian.
Debbie Chazen (born 1971)
Sir Daniel Day-Lewis (born 1957); Day-Lewis's grandfather was Sir Michael Balcon, head of Ealing Studios, helping develop the British film industry. The BAFTA Outstanding British Contribution to Cinema Award is presented every year in honour of Balcon's memory 
Michelle de Swarte (born 1980), comedian, actress, presenter, and former model
Marty Feldman (1934–1982), comedian and actor of Russian Jewish ancestry
Leonard Fenton (né Finestein; 29 April 1926 – 29 January 2022), best known for his role as Dr. Harold Legg in EastEnders; of Lithuanian Jewish ancestry. Also appeared in Dr. Who,Colditz (1974); Secret Army (1977); Z-Cars (1978); Play for Today (1981); Auf Wiedersehen, Pet (1983)
Fenella Fielding (1927–2018); born on 17 November 1927 in Hackney, London, to a Romanian Jewish mother, Tilly ( Katz; 1902–1977), and a Lithuanian Jewish father, Philip Feldman.; starred in The Avengers (TV series), Danger Man, Carry On Screaming!
Carole Ann Ford (born 16 June 1940) best known for her roles in Doctor Who, and as Bettina in the 1962 film adaptation of The Day of the Triffids.
Rosemary Frankau (14 April 1933 – 16 April 2017), daughter of Ronald Frankau and Renee Roberts of Fawlty Towers renown; grand daughter of Julia Frankau; of German Jewish ancestry; played Beattie Harris in Terry and June; former member of the Royal Shakespeare Company. 
Maria Friedman (born 1960), musical theatre actress
Rebecca Front (born 1964), comedy actress
Stephen Fry (born 1957), comedian and actor
Romola Garai (born 6 August 1982), British actress and film director of Hungarian Jewish ancestry, appeared in Amazing Grace, Atonement, and Glorious 39, and in the BBC series Emma, The Hour and The Crimson Petal and the White, nominated for a Golden Globe Award and for BAFTA award.
Andrew Garfield (born 1983)
Rafi Gavron (born 1989), actor
Leo Genn (9 August 1905 – 26 January 1978); prolific English actor and barrister; appeared in well over one hundred films, radio dramas, television shows and classical theatre plays; awarded the Croix de Guerre in 1945; was part of British unit that investigated war crimes at Belsen concentration camp and was an assistant prosecutor at Belsen war crimes trials in Lüneburg, Germany
Brian George (born 1 July 1952) British actor of Iraqi Jewish, Mizrahi Jewish ancestry; appeared in Seinfeld, The Big Bang Theory and Avatar: The Last Airbender.
Hermione Gingold (1897–1987), actress of German Jewish ancestry, wife of Michael Joseph (publisher)
Iddo Goldberg (born 1975)
Brett Goldstein (born 1980), actor and comedian
Henry Goodman (born 1950), actor
Tamsin Greig (born 1966), actress
Jenny Hanley (born 15 August 1947) is an English actress of Russian Jewish ancestry; best known for presenting the ITV children's magazine programme Magpie.
Laurence Harvey (1928–1973), actor
Melvyn Hayes (born 1935) Actor
Gillian Hills (born 5 June 1944 in Cairo) is an English actress and singer of Polish Jewish ancestry, acting in the British films Beat Girl (1960) and Blowup (1966). She is the grand daughter of Bolesław Leśmian, the Polish Jewish poet.
Dennis Hoey (born Samuel David Hyams, 30 March 1893 – 25 July 1960) of Russian Jewish ancestry; best known for playing Inspector Lestrade in six films of Universal's Sherlock Holmes series.
Alan Howard CBE (5 August 1937 – 14 February 2015); member of the Royal Shakespeare Company from 1966 to 1983, and played leading roles at the Royal National Theatre between 1992 and 2000; son of Arthur Howard; of Hungarian Jewish ancestry.
Arthur Howard (born Arthur John Steiner; 18 January 1910 – 18 June 1995) was an English stage, film and television actor.
Leslie Howard (1893–1943), actor
Ronald Howard (British actor) (7 April 1918 – 19 December 1996) was an English actor and writer. He appeared as Sherlock Holmes in a weekly television series of the same name in 1954. He was the son of the actor Leslie Howard.
Jason Isaacs (born 1963), actor
Sid James (1913–1976), actor
Tony Jay (1933–2006), actor
Lesley Joseph (born 1945), actor
Miriam Karlin (1925–2011), actress
Maurice Kaufmann (29 June 1927 – 21 September 1997) actor of stage, film and television, who specialised in whodunits and horror films, from 1954 to 1981, when he retired; married to Honor Blackman.
Davy Kaye MBE (born David Kodeish, 25 March 1916 – 3 February 1998) was a British comedy actor and entertainer.
Robert Kazinsky (born 1983), actor
Barbara Kellerman (born 1949), actress
Felicity Kendal (born 1946), actress
Sara Kestelman (born 12 May 1944) appeared in "Zardoz", "Star Wars", "The New Avengers (TV series)", "Lady Windermere's Fan", as well as performing with the Royal National Theatre and the Royal Shakespeare Company; of Russian Jewish ancestry.
David Kossoff (1919–2005), actor
Harry Landis (1931–2022)
Bettina Le Beau, (23 March 1932 – 8 September 2015), also known as Bettine Le Beau, was a Belgian Jewish actress.
Benny Lee (11 August 1916 – 9 December 1995) was a Scottish Jewish comedy actor and singer; he  portrayed Mr. Klein in the British sitcom, Are You Being Served? (1981).
Anton Lesser (born 1952), actor
Mark Lester (born 1958), actor
Dame Maureen Lipman (born 1946), actress
Leon Lissek, (19 January 1939 – 13 June 2022) appeared in The Professionals (TV series), Journey to the Unknown, Hammer Film Productions, EastEnders and Franz Kafka's The Trial (1993 film).
Roger Lloyd-Pack (8 February 1944 – 15 January 2014) was an English actor of Austrian Jewish ancestry; best known for playing Trigger in Only Fools and Horses and Owen Newitt in The Vicar of Dibley.
Herbert Lom (11 September 1917 – 27 September 2012), a Czech Jewish-British actor who moved to the United Kingdom in 1939; noted for precise, elegant enunciation of English. He is best known for his roles in The Ladykillers, The Pink Panther film series,  War and Peace and the television series The Human Jungle.
Olga Lowe (14 September 1919 – 2 September 2013) stage and television actress of Russian Jewish ancestry.; credits included EastEnders, Where Eagles Dare, Carry On Abroad, Steptoe and Son Ride Again and The Riddle of the Sands.
Ferdy Mayne (11 March 1916 – 30 January 1998); German Jewish British actor known as versatile character actor, often playing suave villains and aristocratic eccentrics in films like The Fearless Vampire Killers, Where Eagles Dare, Barry Lyndon, and Benefit of the Doubt. Mayne worked for MI5 during WW2.
Miriam Margolyes (born 1941), actress
Pamela Mason (10 March 1916 – 29 June 1996), (also known as Pamela Kellino), was an English actress, author, and screenwriter of Ukrainian Jewish ancestry, and daughter of Isidore Ostrer as well as wife of English actor James Mason.
Kay Mellor (born 1951), actress and screenwriter
Martin Miller (actor), born Johann Rudolph Müller, of Austrian Jewish ancestry (2 September 1899 – 26 August 1969), appeared in Danger Man, The Saint (TV series), The Avengers and The Prisoner.
Warren Mitchell (1926–2015), actor
Aubrey Morris (born Aubrey Steinberg; 1 June 1926 – 15 July 2015) ; British actor of Russian Jewish ancestry; appeared in A Clockwork Orange and The Wicker Man.
Julian Morris (born 1983), actor
Wolfe Morris (born Woolf Steinberg, 5 January 1925 – 21 July 1996); English actor of Russian Jewish ancestry who played character roles on stage, television and in feature films from the 1950s until the 1990s.
Tracy-Ann Oberman (born 1966), actress
Sophie Okonedo (born 1969), actress
Ingrid Pitt (born Ingoushka Petrov; 21 November 193723 November 2010) was a British actress of Polish Jewish and German Jewish ancestry, and an author and writer best known for her work in horror films of the 1970s.
Eric Pohlmann (born Erich Pollak ; 18 July 1913 – 25 July 1979) best known for his work in the James Bond films From Russia with Love (film) and Thunderball (film).
Ruth Posner  (née Wajsberg; born 20 April 1933) is a Polish Jewish born British dancer, choreographer, actress former member of the Royal Shakespeare Company.
Hana Maria Pravda (Becková; after first marriage, Munk; after second marriage, Pravda; 29 January 1916, Prague − 22 May 2008, Oxford) was a Czech Jewish actress. Featured in The Unbearable Lightness of Being (film) and Dracula (1974). Other TV credits include: Danger Man, Department S, Callan, Z-Cars, Dad's Army and Tales of the Unexpected.
Natalie Press (born 1980), actress
Lara Pulver (born 1980), actress
Daniel Radcliffe (born 1989), actor
David Rappaport (1951–1990), actor
Robert Rietti,  (8 February 1923 – 3 April 2015), of Italian-Jewish descent; over 200 film credits to his name, prominent in post-production work in the James Bond series, Lawrence of Arabia, Once Upon a Time in America, and The Guns of Navarone.
Edana Romney, Irish Jewish ancestry.
Edina Ronay FRSA (born 8 January 1943) is an Anglo- Hungarian Jewish fashion designer and actress. She is the daughter of food critic Egon Ronay and the mother of actress/writer Shebah Ronay; numerous TV roles included The Avengers, No Hiding Place, Special Branch, The Champions, Randall and Hopkirk (Deceased) and Jason King.
Andrew Sachs (1930–2016), actor
Emma Samms (born 1960)
Danny Schwarz (born 1986), actor, model
Jane Seymour (actress) (born 1951), actress
Anna Shaffer (born 1992)
Cyril Shaps(13 October 1923 – 1 January 2003), English actor of Polish Jewish ancestry, of radio, television and film, with a career spanning over seven decades, appearing in Doctor Who and The Adventures of Paddington Bear.
Carole Shelley (1939–2018), actress
Sir Antony Sher (1949–2021), actor
Dinah Sheridan (born Dinah Nadyejda Ginsburg; 17 September 1920 – 25 November 2012); English actress of Russian Jewish origin; best known for the films Genevieve (1953) and The Railway Children (1970); the long-running BBC comedy series Don't Wait Up (1983–1990).
Vladek Sheybal (12 March 1923 – 16 October 1992) of Polish Jewish ancestry, actor in James Bond film From Russia with Love (film), The Fearless Vampire Killers, Casino Royale (1967 film) and The Lady Vanishes (1979 film).
Rita Simons (born 10 March 1977) best known for playing Roxy Mitchell in the BBC soap opera EastEnders from 2007 to 2017; niece of Alan Sugar.
Georgia Slowe (born 1966), actress
Sarah Solemani (born 1982), actress ; of Iranian Persian Jewish ancestry 
Abraham Sofaer (1 October 1896 – 21 January 1988) was a Rangoon Burmese-born British actor of Iraqi Jewish and Mizrahi Jewish ancestry.
Bernard Spear, (11 September 1919 – 9 May 2003), English actor of Russian Jewish and Polish Jewish ancestry.
Milo Sperber (20 March 1911 – 22 December 1992) was a British actor, director and writer of  Polish Jewish ancestry.
Samantha Spiro, actress
Jennie Stoller (26 April 1946 – 18 November 2018), actress of Russian Jewish ancestry. In a career spanning almost 40 years, she appeared in TV, film, stage and radio productions.
Ed Stoppard (born 1974)
David Suchet, Poirot actor, of Lithuanian Jewish and Russian Jewish ancestry, from the Pale of Settlement of the Russian Empire. 
Gregg Sulkin (born 1992), actor
Clive Swift (9 February 1936 – 1 February 2019), worked with the Royal Shakespeare Company; best known as Richard Bucket in the BBC sitcom Keeping Up Appearances. He played many other television and film roles.
Sydney Tafler (31 July 1916 – 8 November 1979); acted in films and television from the 1940s to the 1970s including Dixon of Dock Green, The Lavender Hill Mob, Alfie (1966 film) and The Spy Who Loved Me (film).
Richard Tauber (16 May 1891 – 8 January 1948) was an Austrian tenor and film actor. Of Viennese Jewish ancestry. Convert to Roman Catholicism.
Dame Elizabeth Taylor (1932–2011), actress
Aaron Taylor-Johnson (born 1990), actor
Harriet Thorpe (born 1957), actress
Harry Towb (27 July 1925 – 24 July 2009) was an actor from Northern Ireland of Russian Jewish ancestry; appeared in The 39 Steps (1959 film) and A Funny Thing Happened on the Way to the Forum .
Meier Tzelniker, actor
Sam Wanamaker (1919–1993), actor
Zoë Wanamaker (born 1949), actress, of Ukrainian Jewish ancestry
David Warner (actor) (29 July 1941 – 24 July 2022); Russian Jewish ancestry; in 1962 joined Royal Shakespeare Company (RSC); appeared in The Thirty Nine Steps,A Christmas Carol, Titanic, Mary Poppins Returns and various characters in the Star Trek franchise, in the films Star Trek V: The Final Frontier, Star Trek VI: The Undiscovered Country and the Star Trek: The Next Generation two-part "Chain of Command" episode. 
Rachel Weisz (born 1970), actress
Rosie Huntington-Whiteley (born 1987), model, actress, and designer
Sophie Winkleman (born 5 August 1980); English actress; member of the extended British royal family; married to Lord Frederick Windsor, the son of Prince Michael of Kent, a paternal cousin of Queen Elizabeth II.
Henry Woolf (1930–2021), actor; worked with Harold Pinter and acted in Doctor Who, Steptoe and Son and numerous William Shakespeare plays

Directors and producers
David Abraham, of Iraqi Jewish Mizrahi Jewish ancestry (born August 1963), a British media executive, who is the former chief executive of Channel 4 Television Corporation.
Lenny Abrahamson, Irish film and television director of Polish Jewish ancestry. 
Ken Adam  (born Klaus Hugo George Fritz Adam; 5 February 1921 – 10 March 2016) was a German Jewish British movie production designer, best known for his set designs for the James Bond films of the 1960s and 1970s, as well as for Dr. Strangelove; won two Academy Awards for Best Art Direction. Together with his younger brother, Denis Adam, he was one of only three German-born pilots to serve in the Royal Air Force during the Second World War.
Tariq Anwar (film editor), of Indian Muslim and Austrian Jewish ancestry, father of Gabrielle Anwar.
Michael Balcon, Lithuanian Jewish ancestry, (19 May 1896 – 17 October 1977) was an English film producer known for his leadership of Ealing Studios.Father of Jill Balcon, grandfather of Daniel Day-Lewis and Tamasin Day-Lewis.
Daniel Battsek, (born in 1958) is an English film producer and executive, and current director of Film4. Previously, he was president of Cohen Media Group, Miramax Films and National Geographic Films.
Jacob Berger (born 1960) is a British-Swiss film director and screenwriter and actor. Son of John Berger, of English, Italian and Russian Jewish ancestry.
Joshua Berger; CBE (born 1966) is an American-born British business executive and producer in the media and entertainment industry, President and managing director of Warner Bros. UK, Ireland, and Spain; outgoing president of Harry Potter Global Franchise Development; outgoing Chairman of the British Film Institute; and board member of the Royal Academy of Dramatic Art.
Monty Berman (16 August 1913 in Whitechapel, London, England – 14 June 2006 in London, England); cinematographer and film and television producer; produced Leslie Charteris's The Saint,The Champions, Department S, its spin-off Jason King, Randall and Hopkirk (Deceased), and The Adventurer.
Sidney Bernstein, Baron Bernstein (30 January 1899 – 5 February 1993), founding chairman of Granada Group and the founder of Granada Television in 1954.
Neil Blair; literary agent, television producer, and film producer; joined Warner Bros. Entertainment, where he became Head of Business Affairs, Europe, worked on productions such as Band of Brothers and Eyes Wide Shut, and helped acquire the film rights for J.K. Rowling’s Harry Potter series; UK ambassador for The Abraham Initiatives and a board member of JW3. 
John Bloom (film editor) (born 12 September 1935) is a British film editor with nearly fifty film credits commencing with the 1960 film, The Impersonator. He is the brother of actress Claire Bloom.
Peter Brook (1925–2022), of Lithuanian Jewish ancestry director
Rudolph Cartier (born Rudolph Kacser, 7 April 1904 – 7 June 1994), Austrian Jewish television director, filmmaker, screenwriter and producer who worked predominantly in British television, exclusively for the BBC.
Danny Cohen (television executive) (born 15 January 1974) President of Access Entertainment; previously the Director of BBC Television from 2013 to 2015; before that, was Controller of BBC One for three years; commissioned Poldark, Doctor Who, Strictly Come Dancing, EastEnders and The Graham Norton Show, and led BBC One's coverage of the 2012 London Olympics.
Danny Cohen, BSC (born 1963); member of the British Society of Cinematographers; renowned for The King's Speech (2010), Les Misérables (2012).
Nat Cohen (23 December 1905 – 10 February 1988); film producer and executive. For over four decades he was one of the most significant figures in the British film industry, as head of Anglo-Amalgamated and EMI Films; known for financing Carry On (franchise) and promoting Ken Loach, John Schlesinger, Alan Parker and David Puttnam.
Norman Cohen, (11 June 1936 in Dublin – 26 October 1983 in Van Nuys, California) was an Irish film director and producer, best known for directing two feature films based on television comedy programmes, Till Death Us Do Part (1969) and Dad's Army (1971).
Sid Colin (born Sidney Coblentz; 31 August 1915 – 12 December 1989), of Russian Jewish origin, was an English scriptwriter, working for radio, television and the cinema.  
Paul Czinner (30 May 1890 – 22 June 1972) was a Hungarian-born British writer, film director, and producer.
Monja Danischewsky (28 April 1911 – 16 October 1994) was a British producer and writer, born in Archangel into a Russian-Jewish family who left Russia for England in 1919.
The Danzigers, Edward J. Danziger (1909–1999) and Harry Lee Danziger (1913–2005) of German Jewish ancestry, produced many British films and TV shows in the 1950s and 1960s.
Bernard Delfont, Baron Delfont, Kt (born Boris Winogradsky; 5 September 1909 – 28 July 1994) was a leading Russian Jewish British theatrical impresario; brother of Lew Grade.
Gaby Dellal (born 1961) is a British actress, film director and writer of Iraqi Jewish and Mizrahi Jewish ancestry. She was born in London.
Jasmine Dellal is a British-born film director and producer.
David Elstein, of Polish Jewish ancestry, (born 14 November 1944), is an executive producer and a former Chair of openDemocracy.net, directed The World at War, British documentary television series chronicling the events of the Second World War .
Maurice Elvey (11 November 1887 – 28 August 1967);one of the most prolific film directors in British history; produced The Grit of a Jew and The Wandering Jew (1923 film). He directed nearly 200 films between 1913 and 1957. He also produced more than fifty films.
Martin Esslin OBE (6 June 1918 – 24 February 2002) of Hungarian Jewish ancestry; British producer, dramatist, journalist, translator, critic, academic scholar and professor of drama, known for coining the term "theatre of the absurd" in his 1961 book The Theatre of the Absurd which has been called "the most influential theatrical text of the 1960s"
Eric Fellner,  (born 10 October 1959) is a British film producer; co-chairman (along with Tim Bevan) of the production company Working Title Films.
Hermann Fellner (26 March 1878 – 22 March 1936); German Jewish screenwriter and film producer. He formed a production company Felsom Film with Josef Somlo in the silent and early sound eras. Following the Nazi takeover of power in 1933, Fellner fled Weimar Germany into exile in Britain.
Cyril Frankel (28 December 19217 June 2017), British film and television director (born Cyril Solomon Israel Frankel), directed for over 30 TV programmes until 1990, such as The Avengers, and the pilot episodes of the ITC Entertainment shows Randall and Hopkirk (Deceased) and Department S, "Timelash", an episode of UFO
Stephen Frears (born 1941), film director, producer
Lewis Gilbert; (6 March 1920 – 23 February 2018) film director, producer, screenwriter who directed more than 40 films during six decades; among them Alfie (1966), Educating Rita (1983) and Shirley Valentine (1989),  You Only Live Twice (1967), The Spy Who Loved Me (1977) and Moonraker (1979).
Jonathan Glazer, (born 26 March 1965) is an English film director and screenwriter.
Jack Gold (28 June 1930 – 9 August 2015), film and television director; part of the British realist tradition which followed the Free Cinema movement.
Isadore Goldsmith (26 May 1893 – 8 October 1964); Austrian Jewish Hungarian Jewish film producer. During the 1930s and 1940s he worked in the British film industry after fleeing from Berlin following Nazi rise to power; married to the novelist Vera Caspary.
Jemima Goldsmith (born 30 January 1974) screenwriter, television, film and documentary producer and the founder of Instinct Productions, a television production company; formerly journalist and  editor of The New Statesman, served as the European editor-at-large for the American magazine Vanity Fair.
Leslie Grade (3 June 1916 – 15 October 1979), born Laszlo (or Lazarus) Winogradsky, was a Russian Jewish British theatrical talent agent; brother of Lew Grade.
Lew Grade (born Lev Winogradsky; 25 December 1906 – 13 December 1998, of Russian Jewish ancestry), leading figure in the creation of ITV (TV network), Associated Television, and ITC Entertainment.
Michael Grade,(born 8 March 1943) television executive ; controller of BBC1 (1984–1986), chief executive of Channel 4 (1988–1997), Chairman of the Board of Governors of the BBC (2004–2006), and executive chairman of ITV plc (2007–2009).
Mutz Greenbaum (3 February 1896 – 5 July 1968), sometimes credited as Max Greene or Max Greenbaum, was a German film cinematographer and one of the pioneers in British film industry in the use of low-key lighting.
Anthony Gross  (19 March 1905 – 8 September 1984) was a British printmaker, painter, war artist and film director of Hungarian-Jewish, Italian, and Anglo-Irish descent, worked on animated films, illustrated a 1929 edition of Jean Cocteau's Les Enfants Terribles
Joseph Grossman (10 October 1888 – 18 January 1949) was a pioneer of the British film industry and the Cinema of the United Kingdom; most famous as the charismatic Studio Manager of Elstree Studios; of German Jewish and Polish Jewish ancestry.
Val Guest; (born Valmond Maurice Grossman; 11 December 1911 – 10 May 2006); English film director and screenwriter; best known for his work for Hammer Film Productions; Work included The Quatermass Experiment (film),Expresso Bongo and When Dinosaurs Ruled the Earth.
Otto Heller, B.S.C. (8 March 1896 – 19 February 1970) was a Czech cinematographer worked on more than 250 films, including Richard III (1955) and The Ladykillers (1955).
Mark Herman, (born 1954), film director and screenwriter, best known for writing and directing the 2008 film The Boy in the Striped Pyjamas.
John Heyman (27 April 1933 – 9 June 2017) was a British film and TV producer also involved in television production, consulting, and film financing ;produced some 15 films, among them The Go-Between and The Hireling, which both won the Grand Prix at the Cannes Film Festival.
Erwin Hillier, (2 September 1911 – 10 January 2005), German Jewish cinematographer known for his work in British cinema from the 1940s to 1960s.
Irene Howard (17 June 1903 – December 1981) was a British casting director. Her brothers Leslie Howard and Arthur Howard, and nephew, Alan Howard, became successful actors. 
Nicholas Hytner(born 7 May 1956); theatre director, film director, and film producer; previously Artistic Director of London's National Theatre; directed Miss Saigon, The History Boys and One Man, Two Guvnors; also known for directing The Madness of King George (1994), The Crucible (1996), The History Boys (2006), and The Lady in the Van (2015). Hytner was knighted in the 2010 New Year Honours for services to drama by Queen Elizabeth II.
Jeremy Isaacs (born 28 September 1932), creator of The World at War, British documentary television series chronicling the events of the Second World War, recipient of many British Academy Television Awards and International Emmy Awards; won the British Film Institute Fellowship in 1986, the International Emmy Directorate Award in 1987 and the BAFTA Fellowship in 1985, General Director of the Royal Opera House, Covent Garden from 1987 to 1996; was the founding chief executive of Channel 4 between 1981 and 1987.
Joseph Janni (21 May 1916, Milan – 29 May 1994, London); of Italian-Jewish ancestry; produced Far from the Madding Crowd (1967 film); Billy Liar (film) with John Schlesinger; also worked with Ken Loach.
Ruth Prawer Jhabvala, novelist and screenwriter of German Jewish ancestry.
Roland Joffé (born 1945), Palme d'Or-winning director
Stephen Joseph (13 June 1921 – 4 October 1967) was an English stage director and pioneer of "theatre in the round," son of actress Hermione Gingold and publisher Michael Joseph.
Nicolas Kent (born 26 January 1945) is a British theatre director. His father arrived in Britain in 1936, a Jewish German refugee, and changed his name from Kahn to Kent.
Beeban Kidron (born 1961)
Michael Klinger (producer), (1 November 1920 – 15 September 1989) was a British film producer and distributor, of Polish Jewish ancestry.
Tony Klinger(born 29 January 1950) is a British film-maker, author and media executive; son of film producer Michael Klinger (producer).
Sir Alexander Korda (1893–1956), Hungarian-born film producer and director
Zoltan Korda (1895–1961), Hungarian-born film director, producer, and screenwriter
Stanley Kubrick; 26 July 1928 – 7 March 1999) film director, producer, screenwriter, and photographer. Widely considered one of the greatest filmmakers of all time; of Romanian-Jewish and Polish Jewish ancestry.
Verity Lambert OBE (27 November 1935 – 22 November 2007) was an English television and film producer and founding producer of Doctor Who from 1963 until 1965.
Walter Lassally (18 December 1926 – 23 October 2017), German Jewish British cinematographer, won the Academy Award for Best Cinematography for Zorba the Greek.
Mike Leigh (born 1943), writer and director of film and theatre
Roberta Leigh was an assumed name for Rita Lewin (née Shulman) (22 December 1926 – 19 December 2014) who was a British author, artist, composer and television producer who wrote romance fiction and children's stories.
Michael Lester (originally Michael Boris Letzer), film producer, actor, and father of Mark Lester.
Robert Levy (producer) (1888–1959) was an English-born theatre manager and film producer whose support for Black actors helped pave the way for the recognition of ethnic diversity in cinema and theatre.
Stuart Levy (producer) (30 November 1907 – 3 June 1966); film producer best known for his long association with Nat Cohen with whom he founded and ran Anglo-Amalgamated.
Oscar Lewenstein (18 January 1917 – 23 February 1997) was a British theatre and film producer, who helped create some of the leading British theatre and film productions of the 1950s and 1960s.
Sanford Lieberson (born 16 July 1936), film producer based in Britain since 1965; Founder of Goodtimes Enterprises; Chief of Production at Goldcrest Films between 1984 and 1986; head of production for UK 20th Century Fox and MGM, inaugural Chair of Film London; set up the Producers course at the National Film and Television School.   
Leo Marks, MBE (24 September 1920 – 15 January 2001); writer, screenwriter, and cryptographer.
Ernest Maxin (22 August 1923 – 27 September 2018); television producer, director, dancer and choreographer; best known for his work in the 1960s and 1970s with Kathy Kirby, Dick Emery, Dave Allen, Les Dawson, and Morecambe and Wise.
Sam Mendes (born 1965), Academy Award-winning director
Paul Merzbach (27 November 1888 – September 1943);  Austrian Jewish screenwriter and film director; following the Nazi rise to power in 1933, Merzbach went into exile in Britain and worked in the British film industry for the remainder of his career. 
Ivor Montagu (23 April 1904, in Kensington, London – 5 November 1984, in Watford), English filmmaker, screenwriter, producer, film critic, writer and Communist activist in the 1930s, awarded Lenin Peace Prize in 1959.
Robert Muller (screenwriter), (1 September 1925 – 27 May 1998), German Jewish-born British journalist and screenwriter, who mainly worked in television,  emigrated to Britain in 1938 as refugee from Nazi Germany.
Sydney Cecil Newman, OC (1 April 1917 – 30 October 1997) was a Canadian born film and television producer of Russian Jewish ancestry, played a pioneering role in British television drama from the late 1950s to the late 1960s.
Sergei Nolbandov (1895–1971) was a Russian Jewish screenwriter, film producer and director, produced 'Memory of the Camps', documenting the conditions Allied troops found when they liberated Nazi concentration camps.
Isidore Ostrer, Ukrainian Jewish ancestry, from the 1920s he owned and ran the Gaumont-British Picture Corporation Limited, which was the largest movie company in the UK in the 1930s, featuring the work of Alfred Hitchcock. 
Dan Patterson (born March 1960); television producer and writer, responsible for the production of both the British and American incarnations of Whose Line Is It Anyway? and satirical panel show Mock the Week with Mark Leveson.
Otto Plaschkes (13 September 1929 – 14 February 2005); film producer, known for work on Lawrence of Arabia (film) and The Homecoming (film).
Stephen Poliakoff (born 1952), film director, screenwriter, and playwright of Russian Jewish ancestry
Robert Popper (born 23 November 1967); comedy producer, writer, actor, and author.
Emeric Pressburger (born Imre József Pressburger; 5 December 19025 February 1988) was a Hungarian Jewish British screenwriter, film director, and producer. He is best known for his series of film collaborations with Michael Powell, in a collaboration partnership known as the Archers, and produced a series of films.
David Puttnam (born 1941) film producer
Karel Reisz (21 July 1926 – 25 November 2002), Czech Jewish born British filmmaker, one of the pioneers of the new realist strain in British cinema during the 1950s and 1960s. Two of the best-known films he directed are Saturday Night and Sunday Morning (1960), a classic of kitchen sink realism, and the romantic period drama The French Lieutenant's Woman (1981).
Joan Rodker(1 May 1915, Kensington, London – 27 December 2010) was an English political activist and television producer; daughter of the modernist poet John Rodker and ballet dancer Sonia Perovskaia Cohen.
Tessa Ross CBE (born 1961); film producer and executive; Head of Film at Channel 4; ran Film4 and Film4 Productions; appointed to the Board of the Royal National Theatre; received the BAFTA Award for Outstanding British Contribution to Cinema Award; named as one of the 100 most powerful women in the United Kingdom by Woman's Hour. She is an honorary fellow of the National Film and Television School. In the 2010 New Year Honours; appointed a CBE for services to broadcasting.
Harry Moses Rowson and Simon Rowson Brothers (born Rosenbaum), of Polish Jewish ancestry, founders of Ideal Film Company, BBC Elstree Centre, and Gaumont-British.
Leslie Rowson (son of Simon Rowson); (1903–1977) was a British cinematographer. Rowson collaborated on several films with the director Michael Powell.
Harry Saltzman, born Herschel Saltzman (27 October 1915 – 28 September 1994) of Polish Jewish ancestry; co-produced first nine of the James Bond film series; lived most of his life in Denham, Buckinghamshire, England.
G. B. Samuelson, Russian Jewish and German Jewish ancestry, film maker and director.
Sydney Samuelson  (1925–2022) was a British film director and cinematographer. He was appointed in 1991 by the government of the UK as the first British Film Commissioner. He was the first President of the UK Jewish Film Festival. 
Peter Sasdy, (born 27 May 1935 in Budapest, Hungary) is a British film and television director of Hungarian Jewish ancestry.
Max Schach (1886–1957) was an Austro-Hungarian-Jewish film producer; particularly associated with British cinema, where he was a leading figure in the boom of the mid-1930s.
John Schlesinger  (16 February 1926 – 25 July 2003) was an English film and stage director, and actor. He won the Academy Award for Best Director for Midnight Cowboy
Richard Sharp (BBC chairman) (born 8 February 1956), Chairman of the BBC since February 2021. A former banker, he worked at JP Morgan for eight years, and then for 23 years at Goldman Sachs. Sharp was an advisor to Boris Johnson during his tenure as London Mayor, and to Rishi Sunak as Chancellor; before coming to the BBC, Sharp served as chairman of the Royal Academy of Arts (2007–2012) and on the Bank of England's Financial Policy Committee (2013–2019).
Geraldine Sherman(born Geraldine Judith Schoenmann on 20 October 1940, Staines, Middlesex, England) known as Dena Hammerstein, is a British actress and writer, and theatre producer. She was the third wife of James Hammerstein, and after his death became president/CEO of James Hammerstein Productions Ltd.
Irene Shubik (26 December 1929 – 26 September 2019), British television producer and story editor of Russian Jewish ancestry, known for development of the single play in British television drama; began career in television at ABC Weekend TV, worked on Armchair Theatre as story editor and devised science fiction anthology series Out of this World.
Gary Sinyor (born 1962), film director, producer, and writer
Josef Somlo (1884–1973); Hungarian Jewish film producer. Following  Nazi takeover in Germany, Somlo went into exile in Britain.
Wolfgang Suschitzky, BSC (29 August 1912 – 7 October 2016), was an Austrian Jewish British documentary photographer, as well as a cinematographer perhaps best known for his collaboration with Paul Rotha in the 1940s and his work on Mike Hodges' 1971 film Get Carter and The Rocky Horror Picture Show in 1975.
Tony Tenser, (10 August 1920 – 5 December 2007) was an English-born film producer of Lithuanian-Jewish descent. 
Brian Tesler CBE (born 19 February 1929), British television producer and executive. His career encompassed British television's post-war evolution from a single-channel BBC to the beginning of today’s multitude of cable and satellite channels. He worked as a producer for Independent Television, as well as the BBC.
Harry Waxman, B.S.C. (3 April 1912 – 24 December 1984) was an English cinematographer. Born in London, Waxman won an award from the British Society of Cinematographers and his other films included Brighton Rock (1947), Swiss Family Robinson (1960), The Day the Earth Caught Fire (1961), Crooks in Cloisters (1964), The Nanny (1965), The Anniversary (1968), and The Wicker Man (1973).
Hannah Weinstein; 23 June 1911 – 9 March 1984, was a Jewish American journalist, publicist and left-wing political activist who moved to Britain and became a well known television producer; best remembered for having produced The Adventures of Robin Hood television series in the mid-to-late 1950s.
Michael Winner (30 October 1935 – 21 January 2013) filmmaker, writer, and media personality of Russian Jewish and Polish Jewish ancestry.
Ben Winston (born 1981)  producer and director; established production company Fulwell 73 with Gabe Turner, Ben Turner, and Leo Pearlman. He is co-executive producer of CBS talk showThe Late Late Show with James Corden alongside Rob Crabbe and Mike Gibbons and show's segments "Carpool Karaoke" and "Drop the Mic"; has collaborated with One Direction, JLS, Robbie Williams, Gary Barlow, Kacey Musgraves, and James Corden; has produced and directed pop culture oriented films, documentaries, concerts, music videos and also produced Brit Awards; was a co-producer of the Grammy Awards and Tony Awards. Winston is son of Lord Winston and Lira Helen Feigenbaum (now The Lady Winston).
C.M. Woolf (10 July 1879 – 31 December 1942) was a British film distributor; distributor of Alfred Hitchcock's early films; managed Gaumont British Picture Corporation and formed General Film Distributors; brought J. Arthur Rank into the film industry; father of producers John and James Woolf, and Rosemary Woolf, scholar of medieval literature
John and James Woolf; Sir John Woolf (15 March 1913, London – 28 June 1999, London) and his brother James Woolf (2 March 1920, London – 30 May 1966, Beverly Hills, California)[1] were British film producers.
Julian Wylie, (1 August 1878 – 6 December 1934), was a British theatrical agent and producer.
Aida Young (née Cohen; 11[1] August 1920 – 12 August 2007) was a British film producer. Her credits include The Quatermass Xperiment,The Invisible Man (1958 TV series),One Million Years B.C., She (1965 film) as well as work for Hammer Film Productions.

Broadcasters

Emma Barnett (born 5 February 1985); broadcaster and journalist; main presenter of Woman's Hour on BBC Radio 4 since January 2021.
Dani Behr (born 1971), TV presenter, actress and singer
Rabbi Lionel Blue (1930–2016), radio broadcaster
Alain de Botton, popular author, broadcaster and Youtube channel entrepreneur, of Ashkenazi and Sephardic ancestry. He co-founded The School of Life. Botton is the son of Gilbert de Botton and descended from a distinguished Sephardic Jewish family; among his ancestors were the rabbinical scholar Abraham de Boton and Yolande Harmer, a  journalist and Israeli intelligence officer. He is also related to Leonard Wolfson, Baron Wolfson,Miel de Botton and Janet Wolfson de Botton,a Trustee of Tate and Chairman of the Council of Tate Modern and appointed Commander of the Most Excellent Order of the British Empire (CBE) in  2006 and elevated to Dame Commander of the Order of the British Empire (DBE) in the 2013 Birthday Honours for charitable services to the arts.
Tom Brook (born 16 June 1953); broadcaster and journalist working primarily for BBC News, BBC World News, BBC News Channel and Talking Movies. Brook's parents were Caspar Brook, the first director of the Consumers’ Association in Britain, and Dinah, journalist for The Observer.
Jonathan Coleman (born 1956), radio broadcaster
Mark Damazer (born 1955), Controller, BBC Radio 4 and BBC 7; in 2011 New Year Honours, he was appointed Commander of the Order of the British Empire (CBE) for services to broadcasting, is Senior Trustee of the Victoria and Albert Museum, chair of the Booker Prize Foundation, and on boards of trustees of the Institute of Contemporary British History.
Vanessa Feltz (born 1962), TV presenter
Matt Frei, German Jewish ancestry, BBC journalist.
Sir Clement Freud (1924–2009)
Loyd Grossman;(born 16 September 1950) TV am and BBC presenter; Rolling Stone journalist and guest musician with Jethro Tull (band); cousin of Ram Dass.
Noreena Hertz (born 24 September 1967) hosted "MegaHertz: London Calling," on Sirius XM's Insight channel and ITV News Economics Editor; wife of Danny Cohen (television executive), who previously held posts as Director of BBC Television and Controller of BBC One; from 1996 to 1997 she worked on the Middle East peace process with Palestinians, Egyptians, Israelis and Jordanians; honorary professor at University College London; Guardian op-ed writer; descendent of the lineage of Joseph Hertz, Chief Rabbi of the United Hebrew Congregations of the British Empire, president of Jewish Historical Society of England, 1922–3, on the Board of Governors of the Hebrew University of Jerusalem, Companion of Honour and Commander of the Order of Léopold II.
Gerard Hoffnung (1925–1959), frequent guest appearances as humorous personality
 Simon Israel, was the Channel 4 News senior correspondent for 25 years ; specialised in reporting on terrorism,  immigration, prisons, police, social and racial issues; covered numerous exclusives which include G20 protests, Stephen Lawrence murder, Victoria Climbie Inquiry, prison suicides and self harm, Windrush and police misconduct; also media consultant for MigrantVoice.
David Jacobs (1926–2013), TV and radio presenter
John Kampfner, author, broadcaster and commentator; Executive Director at Chatham House; has written and presented for Reuters,The Daily Telegraph; chief political correspondent at the Financial Times; political commentator for BBC's Today radio programme; political correspondent on Newsnight; was chair of the Clore Duffield Foundation, Council of King's College London; Chief Executive of the freedom of expression organisation Index on Censorship and established  Creative Industries Federation; shortlisted for the Orwell Book prize. 
Natasha Kaplinsky (born 1972), TV presenter, newsreader
Ian Katz (born 9 February 1968); British journalist and broadcasting executive; Chief Content Officer at Channel 4, overseeing all editorial decision making and commissioning across Channel 4, streaming services and social media.; was a deputy editor of The Guardian.; also the editor of the Newsnight current affairs programme on BBC Two, a role which he left in late 2017 to join Channel 4.
Jacky Klein (born 28 January 1977)  art historian, broadcaster, author; co-presented Britain's Lost Masterpieces for BBC4; co-authored book with sister, Suzy Klein,  What is Contemporary Art? A Children's Guide, commissioned by the Museum of Modern Art, New York, published by Thames & Hudson; has also authored works on Wyndham Lewis and Grayson Perry; in 2015, was Executive Editor at Tate Publishing    
Suzy Klein (born 1 April 1975) author and radio and television presenter; Head of Arts and Classical Music TV for the BBC; winner of William Hardcastle Award for Journalism; was assistant producer at BBC Radio 4 on programmes including Start the Week ; then moved to BBC Television, working as director and producer on arts and music films; listed in The Guardians "25 up-and-coming cultural figures". In 2008, she presented the Proms season on BBC Two; has also presented  The Culture Show, BBC Young Musician of the Year and The Review Show; For Sky Arts, hosted programmes on Sky Arts 2; also presented Aida from Royal Albert Hall (March 2012) for  The Rosenblatt Recitals ; was named Music Broadcaster of the Year, winning the Silver Prize at the Sony Awards; has presented global opera broadcasts for Royal Opera, London, and hosted broadcasts of the Royal Shakespeare Company; in 2021, appointed Head of Arts and Classical Music TV.
Ludwig Karl Koch (1881–1974), broadcaster and sound recordist
Nigella Lawson (born 1960), celebrity chef
Emily Maitlis (born 6 September 1970); journalist, documentary filmmaker, and former newsreader for the BBC; lead anchor until the end of 2021 of Newsnight, the BBC Two news and current affairs programme.
Olly Mann (born 1981), radio presenter
Eric Maschwitz OBE (10 June 1901 – 27 October 1969), sometimes credited as Holt Marvell, was an English entertainer, writer, editor, broadcaster and broadcasting executive of Lithuanian Jewish ancestry.
James Max (born 1970), radio presenter
Mike Mendoza (born 1948), Talksport Radio
Robert Peston (born 1960), BBC news business correspondent; author of Who Runs Britain? How the Super-Rich are Changing our Lives ; son of Maurice Peston, Baron Peston (1931–2016), an economist and Labour life peer who had worked on the Lords Constitution Committee and on committee reviewing the BBC Charter and was chairman of the Pools Panel.
Richard Quest(born 9 March 1962) journalist and barrister working as  news anchor for CNN International; also an editor-at-large of CNN Business; anchors Quest Means Business, the five-times-weekly business program and fronts the CNN shows Business Traveller, The Express and Quest's World of Wonder; Quest wrote the book, The Vanishing of Flight MH370: The True Story of the Hunt for the Missing Malaysian Plane, published by Penguin Random House on 8 March 2016.
Esther Rantzen (born 1940), TV presenter of Polish Jewish ancestry; descendent of Montague Leverson.
Jay Rayner (born 1966), broadcaster and food writer
Jim Rosenthal (born 6 November 1947), sports presenter and commentator who has covered eight FIFA World Cups, three Rugby World Cups, two Olympic Games and 150 Formula One races. His paternal great-grandfather, Leo Olschki, founded Leo S. Olschki Editore publishing house, and his maternal grandfather was German Jewish physician and scholar of Friedrich Nietzsche, Oscar Levy.
Gaby Roslin (born 1964), TV presenter
Nick Ross  (born 7 August 1947) is a British radio and television presenter.
Martin Samuel (born 1964), sports broadcaster
John Suchet, newsreader and brother of David Suchet, son of Jack Suchet, of Russian Jewish ancestry. He is the father of Russia Today presenter Rory Suchet.
Jerry Springer (born 13 February 1944) British-American broadcaster, journalist, actor, producer, former lawyer, and politician who hosted the talk show Jerry Springer; also known as political campaign adviser to Robert F. Kennedy; hosted America's Got Talent, Miss World,Miss Universe,WWE Raw and covered the 2016 United States presidential election for ITV's Good Morning Britain.
Claudia Winkleman (born 1972), daughter of Lady Lloyd, OBE (née Pollard),presented Strictly Come Dancing: It Takes Two, twice nominated for the British Academy Television Award for Best Entertainment Performance,presenter of Film... (TV programme), Fame Academy,hosted  Eurovision Dance Contest 2007,co-presented Eurovision Song Contest 2008 and Sky Movie Premiere's coverage of 79th and 80th Academy Awards; journalist for Tatler,Cosmopolitan (magazine),The Sunday Times and The Independent; judge and the host at the British Film Institute.
Robert Winston, Baron Winston,  (born 15 July 1940) is a British professor, medical doctor, scientist, television presenter and Labour peer;has received at least twenty three  honorary degrees; author of over twenty five books. He is a member of Labour Friends of Israel; father of Ben Winston,renowned for producing a number of the annual Brit Awards from 2011 to 2014 and more recently he was a co-producer of US Grammy Awards and Tony Awards.
Charlie Wolf (born 1959), TalkSport Radio
Alan Yentob (born 1947), of Iraqi-Jewish and Mizrahi Jewish ancestry, arts broadcaster; initiated Arena (British TV series),The Late Show (British TV programme) and Absolutely Fabulous; 1987 was controller of BBC 2, in 1993 promoted to Controller of BBC 1, then promoted to become BBC Television's overall Director of Programmes.
Helen Zaltzman, broadcaster and podcaster

Comedians

Simon Amstell, comedian, TV presenter and actor
Ronni Ancona, impressionist
David Baddiel ( born 28 May 1964); "comedian", op-ed writer, broadcaster and author of over ten books(11?), his latest being the critically acclaimed and well received Jews Don't Count, which is about anti-Semitism, double standards against, exclusion of, and racial prejudice against Jews in Britain.
 Ivor Baddiel, brother of David Baddiel, scriptwriter and author. He regularly writes for some of the "biggest" shows on British television including The BAFTAs ( British Academy Film Awards ), The X Factor and The National Television Awards. Ivor is also the author of nineteen books for both children and adults.
Sacha Baron Cohen (born 1971),was a member of the Cambridge University Amateur Dramatic Club, where he performed in shows such as Fiddler on the Roof and Cyrano de Bergerac, as well as in Habonim Dror, a Labour Zionist youth movement; comedian and actor known for playing the comedic characters Ali G, Brüno, and Borat, the latter of whom is portrayed as extremely antisemitic
Ashley Blaker, comedian and television producer; writer for TV and radio and longtime collaborator with Matt Lucas: was producer of Little Britain and Rock Profile. Lucas described Blaker as "the UK's only Orthodox comedian". Blaker’s Off-Broadway show, Strictly Unorthodox, opened in 2017 at The Theater Center. and his second Off-Broadway show, Goy Friendly opened in February 2020, at SoHo Playhouse.
Issy Bonn, radio, film, and music hall comedian and singer
Arnold Brown
Sam Costa, comedian
Ben Elton (born 3 May 1959) comedian, actor, author, playwright, lyricist and director; was a part of London's alternative comedy movement of the 1980s and writer on the sitcoms The Young Ones and Blackadder, as well as stand-up comedian on stage and television; style in the 1980s was left-wing political satire; Elton is cousin of singer Olivia Newton-John; Elton's father is from a German-Jewish family and Elton's mother, who was raised in the Church of England, is of English background; has published 17 novels and written numerous rock operas and musicals.
Bud Flanagan, comedian and actor
Ronald Frankau, of German Jewish ancestry, (1894–1951), English comedian in cabaret, radio and film.
Steve Furst (born 1967), comedian and actor
Adam Kay (writer) (born 12 June 1980) comedy writer, author, comedian and former doctor. His television writing credits include Crims, Mrs. Brown's Boys and Mitchell and Webb. He is best known as author of the number-one bestselling book This Is Going to Hurt.
Paul Kaye (born 1965), comedian, writer and actor (Dennis Pennis)
Helen Lederer, comedian, was born September 1954 to English mother and Czech-Jewish father.
Matt Lucas (born 5 March 1974), actor, comedian, screenwriter and television presenter best known for his work with David Walliams on the BBC sketch comedy series Little Britain (2003–2006, 2020), though in 2020, show removed from various UK streaming services due to its use of blackface
Robert Popper (born 23 November 1967); comedy producer, writer, actor, and author; credits include The Comic Strip; the Channel 4 show,The Big Breakfast,Bo' Selecta!, Black Books, Spaced and Bremner, Bird and Fortune.
Jess Robinson (born 1993), impressionist, comedian, singer and podcaster
Tony Robinson, actor and comedian.
Ray Martine (1928–2002), comedian
Denis Norden, scriptwriter and radio and TV personality; born Denis Moss Cohen, of Polish Jewish ancestry.
Des O'Connor (1932–2020), comedian, TV presenter and singer
Alexei Sayle (born 1952), Socialist anti-Zionist,anti fascist and pro- Palestinian stand-up comedian of Lithuanian Jewish ancestry
Peter Sellers, comedian and actor; descendent of renowned Sephardi Jewish pugilist, Daniel Mendoza.
Freddie Starr, comedian and actor; mother Hilda (née Feihnen) was of German Jewish ancestry.
Mark Steel (born 4 July 1960), author, broadcaster, stand-up comedian and newspaper columnist of Egyptian Jewish Sephardic Jewish ancestry
Ruby Wax  (born 19 April 1953) is an American-British actress, author of popular self-help books, comedian, television personality, and popular mental health campaigner, of Austrian Jewish descent; appointed Chancellor of the University of Southampton; Wax also teaches business communication in the public and private sectors. Clients include Deutsche Bank, the UK Home Office and Skype.
Bernie Winters
Mike Winters
Andy Zaltzman (born 1974), comedian

Musicians and singers

Larry Adler, harmonica player (American-born; naturalised British)
Ambrose, bandleader
Howie B, sound engineer, mixer and producer, worked with Siouxsie and the Banshees, The Creatures, Steve Reich, The Royal Ballet's Carlos Acosta and dub music pioneers, Sly and Robbie, contributed to Jamaican movie soundtrack for Third World Cop.
Gilad Atzmon,pro-Palestinian, anti-Israel activist and saxophonist for The Blockheads and Pink Floyd; campaigner, author, writer, prolific blogger and bebop jazz musician of Israeli birth and Ashkenazi origin
Jimmy Barnes (born 28 April 1956) is a Scottish-born Australian rock singer; lead vocalist with the rock band Cold Chisel; of Scottish Jewish ancestry.
Beardyman, beatboxing artist
Matt Black, (birth name Matthew Cohn) of Coldcut, DJ
Pauline Black, lead singer of The Selecter and actress
Stanley Black, pianist, composer and bandleader
Sister Bliss, (born Ayalah Deborah Bentovim), British keyboardist,record producer, DJ and songwriter. In the studio, she is best known for her work with Rollo Armstrong and particularly as part of Faithless.
Marc Bolan, leader of rock band T. Rex of Polish Jewish and Russian Jewish ancestry
Elkie Brooks, singer
Ian Broudie, of The Lightning Seeds
Pete Brown (born 1940) is an English performance poet, lyricist, and singer best known for his collaborations with Cream and Jack Bruce. 
Pete Burns, of Dead or Alive
Tito Burns, bandleader
Nicky Chinn (born 16 May 1945); songwriter and record producer, together with Mike Chapman had string of hit singles in the UK and US in the 1970s with The Sweet, Suzi Quatro, Mud and Tina Turner.
Alex Clare, singer
Johnny Clegg, UK-born South African musician
Alma Cogan (born Alma Angela Cohen Cogan, 1932–1966) was a Russian Jewish-Romanian Jewish singer in the 1950s and early 1960s; the highest paid British female entertainer of her era.
Erran Baron Cohen (born May 1968); composer and trumpet player known for collaborations with his younger brother, Sacha Baron Cohen; member of the world music group Zohar who are signed to Ark 21 label, a label owned by Miles Copeland, son of CIA Officer, Miles Copeland Jr.
Steph Cohen, bass guitarist  for anarchist punk rock band, Hagar the Womb.
Antony Costa (born 1981), member of Blue
Tony Crombie (1925–1999), jazz drummer and bandleader (Tony Crombie and his Rockets)
Clifford Curzon, classical pianist
Ivor Cutler (1923–2006), singer-songwriter, poet and humourist
Craig David, singer
Lynsey de Paul, singer-songwriter
Billy Duffy,Jewish Irish ancestry  musician and guitarist for The Cult
Manny Elias (born 21 February 1953) is an Indian-born British drummer and record producer, notable for being the original drummer with Tears for Fears during the 1980s; also played with Peter Gabriel and Adam and the Ants and Roxy Music bassist, Gary Tibbs.
Ray Ellington, was an English singer, drummer and bandleader, brought up a strictly Orthodox Jew by his Russian-Jewish mother. 
Barry Fantoni, jazz musician
Mick Farren,(3 September 1943 – 27 July 2013)Proto-punk musician, anarchist, political activist, anti-fascist agent provocateur and author; foundation figure in the growth of the British Underground press; co-wrote songs with Lemmy Kilmister for Hawkwind and Motorhead was an English rock musician, singer, journalist, and author associated with counterculture and the UK underground.
Nick Feldman, musician in new wave pop band, Wang Chung (band), his father was Basil Feldman, Baron Feldman, a Conservative member of the House of Lords, and his aunt was the actress Fenella Fielding.
Pete Fender, guitarist in punk rock group, Fatal Microbes, son of anarchist musician and activist Vi Subversa.
Shane Fontayne, of Polish Jewish ancestry and parentage from Burma, (born Michael Barakan), played in progressive rock, psychedelic music band, Byzantium (band) with Chaz Jankel.
Justine Frischmann, of Elastica; daughter of Wilem Frischmann who is considered amongst foremost engineers of his generation due to his work on Centre Point, Tower 42 (formerly National Westminster Tower) and Drapers Gardens.
Ray Gelato , jazz musician.
Jess Glynne, singer
Harry Gold (1907–2005), born Hyman Goldberg, was an English British Dixieland jazz saxophonist and bandleader of Polish Jewish and Romanian Jewish ancestry.
Vivien Goldman is a British punk rock and reggae journalist, historian, writer, professor and musician of German Jewish ancestry; made records with The Flying Lizards, On-U Sound Records, Steve Beresford, David Toop, Adrian Sherwood and with Keith Levene, who was founder of The Clash (with Bernard Rhodes),founder of The Flowers of Romance (British band) and guitarist with Public Image Ltd.
Graham Gouldman, Lol Creme and Kevin Godley, members of 10cc
Benny Green, saxophonist and broadcaster
Mick Green (1944–2010) was an English rock and roll guitarist who played with The Pirates.
Peter Green, founding member of Fleetwood Mac
Carl Gombrich, opera singer and academic; son of Richard Gombrich, Sanskrit and Pali scholar of Viennese Jewish origin.
Adrian Gurvitz, of The Gun & Baker Gurvitz Army 
 Paul Gurvitz, of The Gun & Baker Gurvitz Army 
Steffan Halperin, drummer for The Chavs 
Barry Hay, of Golden Earring was born in Faizabad, India, to a Dutch-Jewish mother, Sofia Maria née Sluijter (1922–2004, born in Makassar), and a Scottish commissioned officer, Philip Aubrey Hay (1923–1980). 
Ike Isaacs (1919–1996) was a Burmese-English jazz guitarist of Iraqi Jewish ancestry, best known for his work with violinist Stéphane Grappelli.
Dick James singer, music publisher
Chaz Jankel, of The Blockheads and Ian Dury's proto punk and pub rock band, Kilburn and the High Roads, as well as having recorded with Sly and Robbie at the roots reggae and pioneering avant-garde Compass Point Studios.
Peter Jonas, director, of Ashkenazi, Jamaican and Lebanese ancestry, CBE, FRCM, FRSA, management of the English National Opera (1993), director of Bavarian State Opera (Staatsintendant), awarded the Bayerische Verfassungsmedaille, Fellow of the Royal Society of Arts, Knight Bachelor, Bavarian Maximilian Order for Science and Art.
Mick Jones, of Russian Jewish ancestry, guitarist for The Clash
 Laurence Juber, guitarist
Mark Knopfler, Dire Straits co-founder, lead vocalist and lead guitarist, of Marxist Hungarian Jewish parentage.
Alexis Korner, referred to as founding father of British blues, A major influence on the sound of the British music scene in the 1960s, instrumental in formation of The Rolling Stones and Free. Austrian Jewish father.
Paul Kossoff, son of actor David Kossoff and of Russian Jewish ancestry, guitarist in hard rock blues band Free (band)
Danny Kustow, punk rock guitarist with Generation X and Tom Robinson Band.
Clive Langer, guitarist in Art rock band Deaf School; also played with early Liverpool punk rock band, The Spitfire Boys, with Budgie.
Keith Levene, founder of The Clash and Public Image Ltd and early member of foundation punk rock outfit, The Flowers of Romance (British band), with Sid Vicious.
Jona Lewie, new wave singer on the punk rock Stiff Records label.
Harry Lewis (musician), (born Harris Copperman; 11 January 1915 – 29 April 1998); saxophonist and clarinettist, best known as the husband of singer Vera Lynn.
Joe Loss, bandleader
Lora Logic, X-Ray Spex saxophonist, of German-Jewish origin. Also played for The Raincoats. Convert to Hinduism.
Ivor Mairants, (1908–1998) was a Polish Jewish jazz and classical guitarist, teacher and composer; created the Ivor Mairants Musicentre, a specialist guitar store in London.
Manfred Mann, of Lithuanian Jewish ancestry.
Daniel Miller, founder of Post-punk Industrial music record label Mute Records and member of The Normal, who released TVOD, of Austrian Jewish ancestry.
Crispian Mills, singer of Kula Shaker (paternal grandmother was Jewish)
Jon Moss, English drummer, member of Culture Club and with early British punk rock groups the Damned and Adam and the Ants; auditioned for The Clash in 1976 but chose not to join.
Anthony Newley, singer-songwriter and actor; wrote "Feeling Good", which was covered by Nina Simone, as well as the lyrics for title song in film Goldfinger
Colin Newman(born 16 September 1954), guitarist for early punk rock outfit, Wire (band) who were from the first wave of British punk rock and whose debut album Pink Flag, with its breakneck speed one-minute compositions, was highly influential on later incarnations of thrash and hardcore punk.
Passenger, stage name of singer-songwriter Michael David Rosenberg
Peter Perrett, singer-songwriter of The Only Ones (Mother Austrian Jew)
 Yannis Philippakis, singer and guitarist of Foals. (Mother Ukrainian Jew)
Sid Phillips, jazz clarinetist
Simon Phillips, drummer, for The Who, 801 (band),Judas Priest, Brian Eno, The Michael Schenker Group and Toto; son of Sid Phillips. Simon Phillips is credited with introducing the combination of the double bass drumming that would come to define heavy metal in later years, particularly the ultra fast thrash metal sub-genre which emerged in the 1980s.
Lou Preager (1906–1978), bandleader and pianist.
Oscar Rabin, (1899–1958) was a Latvian-born English bandleader and musician. He was the musical director of his own big band.
Trevor Rabin, guitarist for Progressive Rock outfit Yes (band); also played on records by Michael Jackson, Tina Turner and Bonham (band).
Keith Reid (born 1946), lyricist for Procol Harum
Paul Rich (1921–2000) of Russian Jewish ancestry; singer and guitarist with Lou Preager's band; later became a music publisher; in 1967 became general manager of Carlin Music.
Mark Ronson (born 1975), musician, DJ and producer
Samantha Ronson (born 1977), singer-songwriter
Leon Rosselson (born 1934), singer-songwriter. 
Dan Rothman, guitarist in London Grammar
Rowetta
Harry Roy, bandleader
Ronnie Scott (born Ronald Schatt; 1927–1996); of Russian Jewish ancestry; was a British jazz tenor saxophonist and jazz club owner. He co-founded Ronnie Scott's Jazz Club in London's Soho district, one of the world's most popular jazz clubs, in 1959.
Helen Shapiro, singer
Hank Shaw (born Henry Shalofsky, 1926–2006) was an English bebop jazz trumpeter.
Derek Shulman of progressive rock band Gentle Giant.
Stacey Solomon, finalist on X Factor 2009; mother was born into an Anglican family and was the daughter of a vicar, but converted to Judaism before marrying Solomon's father, who is of Iraqi-Jewish and Polish-Jewish descent. Her parents divorced when she was nine.
Rachel Stevens (born 1978), singer-songwriter, actress, TV presenter
 Gem Stone, drummer in punk rock group, Fatal Microbes, daughter of anarchist musician and activist Vi Subversa.
Lew Stone, bandleader
Vi Subversa (Frances Sokolov), anarchist, of Russian Jewish ancestry, (1935–2016), better known by her stage name Vi Subversa, lead singer, lyricist and guitarist of British anarcho-punk band Poison Girls.
Yevgeny Sudbin, concert pianist
Lewis Taylor, singer/songwriter
Nat Temple (1913–2008) was an English big band leader, and a clarinet and saxophone player.
Sidney Torch (1908–1990), light orchestral conductor and composer
Judie Tzuke, singer-songwriter
Frankie Vaughan (1928–1999), singer, of Russian Jewish ancestry
Jessie Ware, singer-songwriter, musician
John Weider, musician
Louise Wener of Sleeper
Amy Winehouse, (1983–2011), singer-songwriter

Writers

Mick Anglo (born Maurice Anglowitz, 19 June 1916 – 31 October 2011), of Russian Jewish ancestry, was a British comic book writer, editor and artist, as well as an author. He is best known for creating the superhero Marvelman, later known as Miracleman, a character later revived in 1982 in a dark, post-modern reboot by writer Alan Moore, with later contributions by Neil Gaiman.
Bennett Arron (born 1973) Welsh writer, comedian and actor
Dannie Abse (1923–2014), poet, novelist, playwright and doctor.
Gilad Atzmon, be bop saxophonist, anti Israeli, pro Palestinian activist, dissident social critic of Israel, agent provocateur, satirist and author.
Edith Ayrton or Edith Ayrton Zangwill (1879–1945) was a British author and activist. She helped form the Jewish League for Woman Suffrage.
David Baddiel (born 28 May 1964)
 Ivor Baddiel, brother of David Baddiel, scriptwriter and author. He regularly writes for some of the biggest shows on British television including The BAFTAs (British Academy Film Awards), The X Factor and The National Television Awards. Ivor is also the author of nineteen books for both children and adults. 
Zygmunt Bauman (19 November 1925 – 9 January 2017); highly influential Polish Jewish writer, sociologist and philosopher, writing on postmodern consumerism and liquid modernity. 
Rachel Beer, editor-in-chief of The Observer and The Sunday Times, born in Bombay to Sassoon David Sassoon, of the Iraqi Sassoon family. 
Rafael Behr (born June 1974)columnist at The Guardian,Financial Times; former political editor of the New Statesman. Behr was named political commentator of the year at the 2014 Comment Awards; in 2019, he was shortlisted for same award again.
Chaim Bermant (1929–1998), journalist and novelist.
Julie Bindel (born 20 July 1962) is an English radical feminist writer of Roman Catholic and Jewish ancestry.
Lajos Bíró, 22 August 1880 – 9 September 1948, was a Hungarian Jewish novelist, playwright, and screenwriter who wrote many films from the early 1920s through the late 1940s. 
Alain Boublil, author and lyricist
Caryl Brahms (8 December 1901 – 5 December 1982), English critic, novelist, and journalist specialising in the theatre and ballet; also wrote film, radio and television scripts.
Julius Braunthal (1891–1972) was an Austrian Jewish historian, magazine editor, and political activist; Secretary of the Socialist International from 1951 to 1956; wrote three volume History of the International, first published in German between 1961 and 1971.
Anita Brookner  (16 July 1928 – 10 March 2016); of Polish Jewish ancestry, novelist and art historian; Slade Professor of Fine Art at the University of Cambridge from 1967 to 1968; first woman to hold this visiting professorship; awarded Booker–McConnell Prize for her novel Hotel du Lac.
Rivkah Brown; editor of Vashti Media and Novara Media; critic of the concept of the New antisemitism, critic of Israel and Zionism, writes for The Guardian, Independent, the London Review of Books, The Financial Times and New Statesman.Novara Media (often shortened to Novara) is an independent, left-wing alternative media organisation based in the United Kingdom.
Alex Brummer (born 25 May 1949); author of eight books; writes for Jewish News, Times of Israel,  city editor of the Daily Mail; financial editor of The Guardian ; regular contributor to The Jewish Chronicle  writing on business, media, the Holocaust,  Middle East policy; also writes "The Money" article for the New Statesman ; member of editorial board of Jewish Renaissance magazine; Vice-President of the Board of Deputies of British Jews; covered the 1980, 1984, and 1988 US presidential elections for The Guardian and won the 1989 Overseas Press Club award for best foreign correspondent in the US; worked as editor for the Financial Mail on Sunday ; voted Financial Journalist of the Year at the British Press Awards; covered the 2003 Iraq War for the Daily Mail from Washington, D.C.; led the newspaper's coverage on the 2007 run on Northern Rock, collapse of Lehman Brothers, and subsequent credit crunch. In 2009, Brummer appeared as witness at House of Commons Treasury Select Committee to answer questions on role of media in financial stability and "whether financial journalists should operate under any form of reporting restrictions during banking crises".
 Ian Buruma, author and journalist; board member of Human Rights in China; fellow of European Council of Foreign Relations; journalist for The New York Review of Books and has written for The Guardian; held fellowships at Wissenschaftskolleg and at Woodrow Wilson International Center for Scholars in Washington, D.C.; was Alistair Horne fellow of St Antony's College in Oxford.
Mosco Carner (born Mosco Cohen) (15 November 1904 – 3 August 1985) was an Austrian Jewish British musicologist, conductor and critic known for his studies on the life and works of the composers Giacomo Puccini and Alban Berg.
Gerda Charles, novelist, Russian Jewish ancestry.
Barbara Charone author of authorised biography of Keith Richards; Board Member of Chelsea F.C.; journalist and music critic for the NME , Rolling Stone , Sounds magazine and Creem; public relations and press director at WEA; founded the agency MBC PR where clients include Madonna, Depeche Mode, Primal Scream, Robert Plant, Pearl Jam, Rod Stewart and Christina Aguilera as well as comedians David Walliams, Graham Norton and Russell Brand; won the Music Week Press Award in 2006 and 2009; The Guardian included her on list of "The 20 most powerful celebrity makers" as "Britain's most powerful music PR", citing her reviving of careers of Madonna and Neil Diamond and establishing  Duffy and Mark Ronson. Charone is on Chelsea F.C. Board of directors.
Giles Coren (born 1969)
Victoria Coren Mitchell (born 1972)
Aviva Dautch (born 5 May 1978 ) poet, academic, curator and magazine publisher,  of Eastern European ancestry; writer in residence at the British Museum, the Jewish Museum London and the Separated Child Foundation and is resident expert on BBC Radio 4's poetry series On Form ; English co-translator for Afghan refugee poet and BBC World Service journalist Suhrab Sirat; has written articles, and curated exhibitions and events for arts organisations including the Bethlem Museum of the Mind, The British Library, The Royal Academy of Arts and Tara Arts;lectures internationally on Jewish arts and culture. In 2020 she was appointed Executive Director of Jewish Renaissance magazine. Dautch also teaches Jewish Culture and Holocaust Studies at the University of Roehampton and lectures at the London School of Jewish Studies and JW3.
Olive Dehn (29 September 1914 – 21 March 2007) was an English children's writer, anarchist and poet of German Jewish ancestry who was active from the 1930s to the 2000s and wrote stories for the BBC Radio programme Children's Hour.
Isaac Deutscher (3 April 1907 – 19 August 1967); Polish Jewish Marxist author, journalist and political activist who moved to the United Kingdom before the outbreak of World War II; best known as a biographer of Leon Trotsky and as a commentator on Marxist dialectic and Soviet affairs. His three-volume biography of Trotsky was highly influential among the British New Left in the 1960s and 1970s.
Jenny Diski, countercultural protagonist, author and contributor to the UK Underground press, colleague of R.D. Laing, notable for starting the Freightliners free school.
Anton Ehrenzweig (27 November 1908 – 5 December 1966) was an Austrian Jewish British author and theorist on modern art, psychoanalysis and Avant-garde music who wroteThe Psychoanalysis of Artistic Vision and Hearing (1953) and The Hidden Order of Art (1967). 
Norbert Elias (22 June 1897 – 1 August 1990) was a German Jewish sociologist who later became a British citizen; author of The Civilizing Process and especially famous for his theory of civilizing/decivilizing processes.
Samantha Ellis, British playwright and writer of Iraqi Jewish and Mizrahi Jewish ancestry.
Eleanor Farjeon (13 February 1881 – 5 June 1965) was an English author of children's stories and plays, poetry, biography, history and satire. Several of her works had illustrations by Edward Ardizzone. Her most famous work was Morning Has Broken, a Christian hymn first published in 1931.
Mick Farren, Proto-punk musician, anarchist, activist, agent provocateur and author, contributed to the UK Underground press, the International Times, New Musical Express, as well as writing 23 novels and eleven works of non-fiction and was columnist for Los Angeles CityBeat.
Richard Ferrer; journalist and editor of Jewish News; sub-editor at the Daily Mirror; written for FHM, Maxim (magazine), Vox (website), the Daily Telegraph, The Times, Algemeiner, The Times of Israel and the Independent; regular contributor to programmes on BBC Radio 4. 
 Lord Baron Daniel Finkelstein,(born 30 August 1962); journalist and politician; writes for Jewish Chronicle; former executive editor of The Times.; former chairman of Policy Exchange; chair of the think tank Onward; made a member of the House of Lords in August 2013, sitting as a Conservative.
Gilbert Frankau (21 April 1884 – 4 November 1952), popular British novelist; known also for verse (he was a war poet of World War I), including a number of verse novels, and short stories.
Pamela Frankau (3 January 1908 – 8 June 1967) popular novelist from a prominent artistic and literary family who wrote over thirty novels; grandmother was novelist Julia Frankau; father was Gilbert Frankau; partner was Italian-Jewish poet Humbert Wolfe.
Giles Fraser (born 27 November 1964)  English Anglican priest of Jewish ancestry, journalist and broadcaster ; regular contributor to Thought for the Day and The Guardian and a panellist on The Moral Maze, as well as an assistant editor of UnHerd ; voted Stonewall Hero of the Year in 2012; lectures on moral leadership for the British Army at Defence Academy.
 Jonathan Freedland, journalist and leading liberal Zionist; worked on kibbutz in Israel with the Labour Zionist Habonim Dror (where Freedland had been a mentor to Sacha Baron Cohen);later writing for The Guardian, Daily Mirror, the London Evening Standard, The Jewish Chronicle, The New York Times, The New York Review of Books, Newsweek and The New Republic; in 2022 wrote highly acclaimed stage play Jews. In Their Own Words which the Royal Court Theatre described as a "searing and incisive play looking at the roots and damning legacy of antisemitism in Britain"; son of  biographer and journalist Michael Freedland, and Israeli-born Sara Hocherman.
Michael Freedland (18 December 1934 – 1 October 2018); biographer, author, journalist and broadcaster; wrote for The Sunday Telegraph, The Spectator, The Guardian, The Observer,The Jewish Chronicle and The Economist; wrote and presented programmes for BBC Radio 2. His radio show You Don't Have To Be Jewish ran for 24 years.
Gillian Freeman (1929–2019), novelist and screenwriter; best known for her screenplays for The Leather Boys, I Want What I Want (film) and Only Lovers Left Alive (novel).
Hadley Freeman (born 15 May 1978) American British journalist based in London; writes for the Jewish Chronicle, The Guardian and Vogue; of Austro-Hungarian and Polish Jewish ancestry.
Neil Gaiman, graphic novelist and fantasy writer, Polish Jewish ancestry.
Ernest Gellner, social anthropologist scholar of nationalism and identity; of Austrian Jewish Czech Jewish origin.
Morris Ginsberg FBA (14 May 1889 – 31 August 1970) was a British sociologist and prolific author who played a key role in the development of the discipline of sociology. He served as editor of The Sociological Review in the 1930s and later became the founding chairman of the British Sociological Association in 1951 and its first President (1955–1957). He was president of the Aristotelian Society from 1942 to 1943, and helped draft the UNESCO 1950 statement titled The Race Question.
Maurice Glasman, Baron Glasman (born 8 March 1961); prolific author, political theorist, academic, social commentator, and Labour life peer in the House of Lords; senior lecturer in Political Theory at London Metropolitan University and Director of its Faith and Citizenship Programme; best known as a founder of Blue Labour, a term he coined in 2009;called on the Labour Party to establish dialogue with the far-right English Defence League (EDL) in order to challenge their views; called for some immigration to be temporarily halted and for the right of free movement of labour, a key provision of the Treaty of Rome, to be abrogated, dividing opinion among Labour commentators.; accepted the visiting professorship he was offered by Haifa University, telling The Jewish Chronicle: "If people I know say they want to boycott Israel, I say they should start by boycotting me". At the 2016 Limmud conference, he suggested the Labour Party's antisemitism harked back to Jewish Marxists, who wanted to "liberate Jews" from their Judaism.
Tanya Gold (born 31 December 1973) is an English journalist who has written for The Jewish Chronicle,The New York Times The Guardian, the Daily Mail, The Independent, The Daily Telegraph, The Sunday Times and the Evening Standard, and for The Spectator magazine.
Adrian Goldberg, (born in 1961 in Northfield, Birmingham) is an English journalist, radio and television presenter of German Jewish ancestry; hosts the Byline Times Podcast.
Jane Goldman (born 1970), screenwriter, author and producer
Vivien Goldman is a British author and academic of German Jewish ancestry, focusing on the historiography, Praxis (process), dialectic and epistemology of punk rock, dub, and reggae.
Ernst Gombrich, art historian and scholar of Viennese Jewish origin.
Richard Gombrich, writer of Viennese Jewish ancestry, British Indologist and scholar of Sanskrit, Pāli, and Buddhist studies; historian of Tripiṭaka, Sthavira nikāya, Mahāsāṃghika schools, Abhidharma, Vinaya, Theravada, and ancient collections of Buddhist texts
Geoffrey Gorer, psychoanalytic anthropologist, author and writer.
 Siam Goorwich, journalist for The Guardian and The Jewish Chronicle.
David Graeber, British-American author, academic, scholar and anarchist activist, writer of Ashkenazi origin.
Tony Greenstein, anti Zionist, anti fascist pro Palestinian, socialist writer, social critic of Israel and activist of Polish Jewish rabbinical lineage and ancestry; author of The Fight Against Fascism in Brighton & the South Coast and Zionism: Antisemitism’s twin in Jewish garb.
Simon Hattenstone (born 29 December 1962 in Salford, England); journalist and writer; features writer and interviewer for The Guardian. He has also written or ghost-written a number of biographical books.
David Hirsh (born 29 September 1967); pro-Zionist, pro-Israeli author and scholar; senior Lecturer in Sociology at Goldsmiths, University of London, and co-founder of Engage, a campaign against the academic boycott of Israel; helped develop the Euston Manifesto. 
Anthony Horowitz (born 1956)
Howard Jacobson (born 1942), author; has described himself as "a Jewish Jane Austen" (in response to being described as "the English Philip Roth"), and also states, "I'm not by any means conventionally Jewish. I don't go to shul. What I feel is that I have a Jewish mind, I have a Jewish intelligence. I feel linked to previous Jewish minds of the past. I don't know what kind of trouble this gets somebody into, a disputatious mind. What a Jew is has been made by the experience of 5,000 years, that's what shapes the Jewish sense of humour, that's what shaped Jewish pugnacity or tenaciousness." He maintains that "comedy is a very important part of what I do." Jacobson expressed concern over antisemitism in the Labour Party under Jeremy Corbyn's leadership, with particular reference to a growth in Anti-Zionism and its "antisemitic characteristics" which were "a taint of international and historic shame" and that trust between the party and most British Jews was "fractured beyond repair".
Ben Judah(born 1988) is a British journalist and the author of This Is London and Fragile Empire;son of author Tim Judah; of Baghdadi Jewish descent; was a policy fellow in London at the European Council on Foreign Relations; has also been a visiting fellow at the European Stability Initiative in Istanbul; was a research fellow at the Hudson Institute in Washington D.C. In 2020, he joined the Atlantic Council in Washington D.C. as a Nonresident Senior Fellow. Judah has written for various progressive and conservative think-tanks including The Center For American Progress (CAP) and Policy Exchange.
Tim Judah(born 31 March 1962) is a British writer of Iraqi Jewish ancestry, reporter and political analyst for The Economist. Judah has written several books on the geopolitics of the Balkans, mainly focusing on Serbia and Kosovo.
Tony Judt  (2 January 1948 – 6 August 2010) was a British-American historian, essayist and university professor of Russian Jewish and Romanian Jewish ancestry, who specialised in European history;in aftermath of the Six-Day War, Judt worked as a driver and translator for the Israel Defense Forces. After the war, Judt's belief in the Zionist enterprise began to unravel and he then called for the conversion of "Israel from a Jewish state to a binational one" that would include all of what is now Israel, Gaza, East Jerusalem, and the West Bank. This proposed new state would have equal rights for all Jews and Arabs living in Israel and the Palestinian territories.
Anthony Julius (born 16 July 1956)  author of Trials of the Diaspora: A History of Anti-Semitism in England   focusing on tendency in English history that is discriminatory against Jews, arguing that current anti-Zionism in England developed out of antisemitism in the United Kingdom and utilises the same antisemitic tropes in its arguments; was chairman of the board of The Jewish Chronicle; campaigned against  academic boycott of Israeli universities; was founding member of Engage and Euston Manifesto; known for being Diana, Princess of Wales divorce lawyer and for representing Deborah Lipstadt in trial against David Irving.
Judith Kerr (1923–2019), writer and illustrator.
Gerald Kersh (1912–1968) was a British Jewish and later also American writer of novels and short stories; his most famous work was Night and the City (1938)  
Nick Lowles, founder of Hope Not Hate and former editor of the anti-fascist Searchlight (magazine), backed by various politicians and celebrities several trade unions. Knowles is the author of a number of books on football violence, right wing groups and anti-Semitism in Britain.He was an freelance investigative journalist, working in television, including on BBC Panorama, World in Action, Channel Four Dispatches and MacIntyre Undercover.
Pannonica de Koenigswarter (née Rothschild; 10 December 1913 – 30 November 1988) was a British-born jazz patron and writer. A leading patron of bebop, she was a member of the Rothschild family.
Arthur Koestler,  (5 September 1905 – 1 March 1983) was a Hungarian Jewish author and journalist.
Bernard Kops (born 1926), poet, novelist and playwright
Lotte Labowsky; (1905–1991), Jewish German writer, author, scholar and classicist; became a Fellow of Somerville College, Oxford; specialised in "the transmission of ancient Greek thought to the western world"
Nicole Lampert, pro Israel, pro Zionist journalist for Daily Mail, The Independent, The Telegraph, Metro (UK), New York Post, News.com.au, Newsweek, Sydney Morning Herald, New Zealand Herald, The Times of Israel, The Jewish Chronicle, and Jewish News.
 Adam Langleben, journalist for The Jewish Chronicle, Haaretz, Times of Israel, HuffPost UK, New Statesman, The New European, The Jewish News Podcast; national secretary of Jewish Labour Movement which is a member of coalition of Avodah/Meretz/Arzenu/Ameinu within the World Zionist Organization and its sister parties are the Israeli Labor Party (Havodah) and Meretz; affiliated to the Board of Deputies of British Jews.
Tamasin Day-Lewis, journalist and critic.
Denise Levertov (1923–1977), poet.
Andrea Levy FRSL (7 March 1956 – 14 February 2019), of Afro-Jamaican and Sephardi ancestry.
Gertrude Rachel Levy  (5 November 1883 – 10 October 1966) was an author and cultural historian of German Jewish ancestry, writing about comparative mythology, matriarchy, epic poetry and archaeology; published many of her works under the name "G. Rachel Levy".
Bernard Lewis,  (31 May 1916 – 19 May 2018);  specialised in Oriental studies; public intellectual and political commentator; wrote over ten books on  history of Islam and the interaction between Islam and the West; was called "the West's leading interpreter of the Middle East". Others have accused Lewis of having revived the image of cultural inferiority of Islam and of emphasising the dangers of jihad. His advice was frequently sought by neoconservative policymakers, including the Bush administration. However, his active support of the Iraq War and neoconservative ideals have since come under scrutiny.
Martin Lewis (financial journalist)CBE (born 9 May 1972) financial journalist and broadcaster, has worked for BBC,Channel 5 (British TV channel),ITV's This Morning (TV programme) and written for The Sunday Post, The Yorkshire Post, the Manchester Evening News, Express & Star, has been a columnist for The Sunday Times, News of the World, The Guardian and the Sunday Express.
 Emanuel Litvinoff, novelist.(5 May 1915 – 24 September 2011) was a British writer and well-known figure in Anglo-Jewish literature, known for novels, short stories, poetry, plays and human rights campaigning. Litvinoff became aware of plight of persecuted Soviet Jews, and started worldwide campaign against this persecution. Due to Litvinoff's efforts, prominent Jewish groups in United States became aware of issue, and well-being of Soviet Jews became cause for a worldwide campaign, eventually leading to mass migration of Jews from the Soviet Union to Israel and the United States. For this he has been described by Meir Rosenne, former Israeli ambassador to the United States, as "one of the greatest unsung heroes of the twentieth century... who won in the fight against an evil empire" and that "thousands and thousands of Russian Jews owe him their freedom".
Mina Loy (born Mina Gertrude Löwy; 27 December 1882 – 25 September 1966) was a British-born artist, writer, poet, playwright, novelist, painter, designer of lamps, and bohemian; of Hungarian Jewish ancestry and one of the last of the first-generation modernists to achieve posthumous recognition.
Moshé Machover (Hebrew: משה מחובר; born 1936) is a mathematician, philosopher, pro Palestinian socialist antifascist activist and author, noted for his writings against Zionism and fascism. 
David Magarshack (23 December 1899 – 26 October 1977); author, translator and biographer of Russian authors, best remembered for his highly respected translations of Dostoevsky, Chekhov and Nikolai Gogol; of Russian Jewish ancestry; Anthony Powell paid tribute to him saying "David Magarshack has revolutionised the reading of Dostoyevsky’s novels" and Kazuo Ishiguro stated, "I’ve been greatly influenced by the translator, David Magarshack...when people ask me who my big influences are, I feel I should say David Magarshack, because I think the rhythm of my own prose is very much like those Russian translations that I read."
David Zane Mairowitz; British-American; immigrated to England, where he was one of the founding editors of International Times.
Wolf Mankowitz (7 November 1924 – 20 May 1998) was an English writer, playwright and screenwriter of Russian Jewish ancestry. Father of rock and fashion photographer Gered Mankowitz.
Ivan Margolius (born 27 February 1947) is an author, architect and propagator of Czech culture;  author of books on art, architecture, automobiles, design and history.  
George Markstein, (29 August 1926 – 15 January 1987), of German Jewish ancestry, British journalist and writer of thrillers and teleplays, writing scripts for Danger Man, Armchair Theatre, The Odessa File (film), and Return of the Saint.
Madeleine Masson Rayner (née Levy; 23 April 1912 – 23 August 2007), author of plays, film scripts, novels, memoirs and biographies; best known for her biography of the highly respected and decorated war heroine, Polish agent of the British Special Operations Executive, Krystyna Skarbek.
Carl Mayer (20 November 1894 – 1 July 1944) was an Austrian screenwriter who wrote screenplays to The Cabinet of Dr. Caligari (1920), The Head of Janus (1920), The Haunted Castle (1921), Der Letzte Mann (1924), Tartuffe (1926), Sunrise: A Song of Two Humans (1927), and 4 Devils (1928); fundamental figure in the dramatic and narrative establishment of both German expressionist cinema and Kammerspielfilm. Buried in Highgate Cemetery.
Gerard Menuhin, son of Yehudi Menuhin
Monty Meth  (3 March 1926 – 14 March 2021) was a British journalist who was editor of the Daily Mail; was member of the Young Communist League;appointed Member of the Order of the British Empire (MBE) in the 2007 Queen's Birthday Honours for services to the communities of Enfield and Bethnal Green.; author of Here to Stay: A Study of Good Practices in the Employment of Coloured Workers 1972; Brothers to all Men? A Report on Trade Union Actions and Attitudes on Race Relations.
Ralph Miliband (born Adolphe Miliband; 7 January 1924 – 21 May 1994) sociologist and Marxist author of Polish Jewish ancestry; father of Ed Miliband and David Miliband, described as "one of the best known academic Marxists of his generation", on a par with E. P. Thompson, Eric Hobsbawm and Perry Anderson.
Sabrina Miller; pro-Israel pro Zionist journalist and activist writing for the conservative newspaper The Mail on Sunday, Jewish News,The Jewish Chronicle and The Daily Telegraph
Lily Montagu, author, suffragette, political activist, CBE (22 December 1873 – 22 January 1963) was the first woman to play a major role in Progressive Judaism.
Richard Millett, pro-Israel pro Zionist journalist and activist writing for Algemeiner Journal,The Times of Israel and The Jewish Press, highlighting and challenging rising anti-Semitism in Britain, specifically Antisemitism in the UK Labour Party and the danger of New antisemitism.
Charles Shaar Murray; proto-punk music journalist for the New Musical Express, of Viennese Jewish origin.
Saul Newman, anarchist scholar and activist,(born 22 March 1972) is a British political theorist who writes on post-anarchism. He is professor of political theory at Goldsmiths College, University of London.
Yotam Ottolenghi (born 14 December 1968),Israeli-British celebrity chef; journalist for The Guardian and Haaretz; author of several cookery books, including Ottolenghi: The Cookbook (2008), Plenty (2010), Jerusalem ( 2012). Moved to Europe after his service in Military Intelligence Directorate (Israel); in 2014,London Evening Standard remarked that Ottolenghi had "radically rewritten the way Londoners cook and eat"; in 2017 was guest judge on Masterchef Australia.
Ursula Owen, of German Jewish ancestry; founding director for the feminist Virago Press, cultural policy advisor to the Labour Party (UK) , editor and chief executive of Index on Censorship, a magazine for free expression; on the board of the Southbank Centre and English Touring Opera; on the board of the New Statesman and the committee of the Royal Literary Fund. 
Ilan Pappé, dissident Israeli-British scholar of Ashkenazi origin, writer and author from the New Historians school, focusing on the history of The Nakba, intifada, Palestinian land ownership and rights and radical Anti-Zionism.
Julia Pascal, playwright and director
Nikolaus Pevsner  (30 January 1902 – 18 August 1983) was a German Jewish British art historian and architectural historian, also of Russian Jewish ancestry, best known for his  series of county-by-county guides, The Buildings of England (1951–74).
Melanie Phillips,(born 4 June 1951) Neoconservatism, and right wing hawkish pro Zionist journalist; began her career writing for The Guardian and New Statesman; during the 1990s, she came to identify with ideas more associated with the right and currently writes for The Times, The Jerusalem Post, and The Jewish Chronicle, covering political and social issues from a social conservative perspective; was panelist on BBC Radio 4 programme The Moral Maze and BBC One's Question Time; was awarded the Orwell Prize for Journalism. 
Harold Pinter, playwright, director, actor
Michael Polanyi  (11 March 1891 – 22 February 1976) was a Hungarian-British polymath, prolific author who made important theoretical contributions to physical chemistry, economics, and philosophy.
Stephen Pollard (born 18 December 1964); was editor of The Jewish Chronicle; was researcher for Labour MP Peter Shore; worked for the Fabian Society; joined the Social Market Foundation; Senior Fellow at Civitas; was president for the Centre for the New Europe and in 2007,  first chair of the European Institute for the Study of Contemporary Antisemitism;signatory founder of the Henry Jackson Society, a neoconservative British foreign policy think tank.
Karen Pollock   journalist, writer, activist chief executive of  Holocaust Educational Trust (HET) ; was Director of the All-Party Parliamentary Group against Antisemitism; later joined Holocaust Educational Trust (HET) ; is involved with the anti-fascist organisation Searchlight and London Jewish Forum, as well as the Holocaust Memorial Day Trust. She has written for The Guardian, Jewish News, The Jewish Chronicle, and The Huffington Post ; gave TED talk entitled 'The search for humanity in the Holocaust' for TEDxDurhamUniversity 2016.She represented British Jews at United Nations World Conference against Racism.She is a vice-president of the Jewish Leadership Council.She was appointed Member of the Order of the British Empire (MBE) in the 2012 New Year Honours for services to education, specifically about the Holocaust, and Commander of the Order of the British Empire (CBE) in the 2020 Birthday Honours for services to Holocaust education.
Marjorie Proops OBE (formerly Rayle, née Israel; 10 August 1911 – 10 November 1996) writer, journalist and agony aunt writing the column Dear Marje for Daily Mirror newspaper.
Richard Quest(born 9 March 1962) journalist and barrister working as  news anchor for CNN International; also an editor-at-large of CNN Business; anchors Quest Means Business, the five-times-weekly business program and fronts the CNN shows Business Traveller, The Express and Quest's World of Wonder; Quest wrote the book, The Vanishing of Flight MH370: The True Story of the Hunt for the Missing Malaysian Plane, published by Penguin Random House on 8 March 2016.
Gideon Rachman (born 1963) is a British journalist of Jewish South African ancestry.
 Barnaby Raine is an anti fascist, anti Zionist, pro-Palestinian author, journalist, intellectual and broadcaster, writing for New Internationalist, n+1, Salvage, Red Pepper (magazine), Novara Media, Jacobin (magazine), Counterfire (group) and others.
Claire Rayner (1931–2010), agony aunt and broadcaster
Jay Rayner (born 14 September 1966) food critic for The Guardian, The Mail on Sunday, GQ, Esquire, Cosmopolitan, New Statesman and Granta; first novel, The Marble Kiss, published in 1994, shortlisted for Author's Club First Novel Award; second novel , Day of Atonement (1998) shortlisted for the Jewish Quarterly Prize for Fiction
Emma Richler (born 1961) is a British actress and author.
Nick Robinson, BBC broadcaster of German Jewish ancestry; was president of the Oxford University Conservative Association; president of the Conservative Party youth group; was deputy editor of Panorama; worked for ITV News as political editor; presented Westminster Live, Weekend Breakfast and Late Night Live on BBC Radio 5 Live and Newsnight on BBC Two;covered general election for BBC Radio; co-hosted BBC Two's Icons: The Greatest Person of the 20th Century alongside Claudia Winkleman; hosted final debate between Boris Johnson and Jeremy Corbyn prior to 2019 general election; author of two books.
Claudia Roden  (née Douek; born 1936) is an Egyptian-born British cookbook writer and cultural anthropologist of Sephardi/Mizrahi descent.
John Rodker (18 December 1894 – 6 October 1955) was an English writer, modernist poet, and publisher of modernist writers and one of the "Whitechapel Boys", a group including Isaac Rosenberg, Mark Gertler, David Bomberg, Samuel Weinstein and Joseph Lefkowitz 
Jon Ronson (born 1967), screenwriter
Adele Rose (8 December 1933 – 28 December 2020) was an English television writer. She was the longest-serving scriptwriter for the soap opera Coronation Street, writing 457 scripts over a period of 37 years from 1961, and was the first woman to write for the show. She also originated the series Byker Grove (1989–2006), aimed at teenagers.
Michael Rosen (born 1946)
Isaac Rosenberg, war poet
Jack Rosenthal   (8 September 1931 – 29 May 2004), wrote scripts for ITV soap opera Coronation Street and over 150 screenplays, including original TV plays and feature films; street in Manchester named after him, next to centre of contemporary art, theatre and film, HOME.
Dan Sabbagh, Defence and Security Editor and Journalist for The Guardian
Michael Samuels (linguist) (14 September 1920 – 24 November 2010) was a British historical linguist, responsible for the Historical Thesaurus of English; son of Harry Samuels, and Céline Aronowitz: his sister was actress Miriam Karlin 
George Sassoon,(30 October 1936 – 8 March 2006) was a British scientist, electronic engineer, linguist, translator and science fiction author of Iraqi Jewish Mizrahi Jewish origin;  author of The Manna-Machine (1978) and The Kabbalah Decoded (1978).
Siegfried Sassoon, writer and WW1 poet, of Iraqi Jewish Mizrahi Jewish origin.
Charles Saatchi (born 9 June 1943); author of numerous books, periodicals, journals and monographs on art and culture, Mizrahi Jewish Iraqi-Jewish British businessman and co-founder, with brother Maurice, of advertising agency Saatchi & Saatchi, the world's largest advertising agency; later formed a new agency called M&C Saatchi; also known for his art collection and for owning Saatchi Gallery, and for sponsorship of the Young British Artists (YBAs), including Damien Hirst and Tracey Emin.Successful campaigns included Silk Cut's advertisements and those for Conservative Party's 1979 general election victory – led by Margaret Thatcher through the slogan "Labour Isn't Working". Other clients included British Airways. In the Sunday Times Rich List 2009 ranking of the wealthiest people in the UK, was grouped with brother Maurice, with estimated  fortune of £120 million.
Simon Schama  (born 13 February 1945), author of Lithuanian Jewish ancestry, specialising in art history, Dutch history, Jewish history, and French history. He is a University Professor of History and Art History at Columbia University, New York.
David Seidler (born 1937) playwright and film and television writer. best known for writing the scripts for the stage version and screen version for the story The King's Speech (produced by Emile Sherman) for which he won the Academy Award and a BAFTA for Best Original Screenplay; son of Doris Seidler (1912–2010), painter, printmaker and graphic artist.
Michael Segalov; of Polish Jewish ancestry; News Editor at Huck (magazine); writes regularly for The Independent, Vice (magazine), BBC and The Guardian.
Will Self (born 26 September 1961); author, journalist, political commentator and broadcaster; regular contributor to The Guardian, Harper's Magazine, The New York Times , London Review of Books and New Statesman; regular contributor to Have I Got News for You, Shooting Stars  for two series; also appears on Newsnight ,Question Time, BBC Radio 4 programme A Point of View.
Nicholas Serota,  (born 27 April 1946), author, art historian and curator; served as Director of the Tate from 1988 to 2017; currently Chair of Arts Council England; was previously Director of The Museum of Modern Art, Oxford, and Director of the Whitechapel Gallery,  before becoming Director of the Tate; was also Chairman of the Turner Prize jury .
Rachel Shabi; British journalist and author; contributing writer to The Guardian and the author of Not the Enemy, Israel's Jews from Arab Lands, which argued that Israel has discriminated against and culturally stripped its population of Jews from Arab and Muslim countries. The book received a National Jewish Book Award.Born in Israel to Iraqi Jewish parents in Ramat Gan, Shabi grew up in the UK.
Anthony Shaffer (writer) (15 May 19266 November 2001); English playwright, screenwriter, novelist, and advertising executive; brother of Peter Shaffer.
Peter Shaffer (Sir Peter Levin Shaffer)  (15 May 1926 – 6 June 2016) was an English playwright, screenwriter, and novelist. He wrote numerous award-winning plays, of which several were adapted into films.
Avi Shlaim, writer of Iraqi Jewish and Mizrahi Jewish  origin. He is one of Israel's New Historians, a group of Israeli scholars who put forward critical interpretations of the history of Zionism and Israel.
Andrew Shonfield (10 August 1917 – 23 January 1981) was a British economist  of Czech Jewish ancestry, best known for writing Modern Capitalism (1966), also worked as journalist and foreign editor of The Financial Times from 1950 until 1958, then worked as The Observers economic editor.
Zuzanna Shonfield, Polish Jewish, born (31 January 1919, Warsaw – 1 February 2000, Greater London) was writer and historian best known as the author of the book The Precariously Privileged (1987) as well as editor of her husband’s, Andrew Shonfield, works The Use of Public Power (1982) and In Defence of the Mixed Economy (1984).
Peter Simons aka Penny Reel, contributed to the UK Underground press, pioneering reggae historian, scholar, promotor, archivist, author, and journalist for The NME and Echoes (magazine), highly influential in introducing roots reggae and Dub music to the British people in the 60s and 70s, biographer of Dennis Brown, of Russian Jewish ancestry.
Robert Skidelsky, Baron Skidelsky  (born 25 April 1939) , of Russian Jewish ancestry, author of fifteen academic texts on economics and politics, focusing on, amongst others, fascist Oswald Mosley and he is the author of a three-volume award-winning biography of British economist John Maynard Keynes (1883–1946). Skidelsky also writes for  The Guardian, The New York Times, Daily Mail, Financial Times.
 Jon Sopel, journalist; presents The Politics Show on BBC One; one of the lead presenters on News 24; voted 'Political Journalist of the Year' by Public Affairs Industry;shortlisted for 'National Presenter of the Year' at the Royal Television Society television journalism awards 2011/2012.
Stephen Spender  (28 February 1909 – 16 July 1995); English poet of German Jewish ancestry, novelist who concentrated on themes of social injustice and Marxist class struggle; appointed Poet Laureate Consultant in Poetry by the United States Library of Congress in 1965.
Tom Stoppard (born 1937), playwright
David Sylvester CBE (21 September 1924 – 19 June 2001); prolific author, art critic, journalist and curator; trustee of the Tate Gallery; influential in promoting modern artists Francis Bacon, Joan Miró, and Lucian Freud; father of modern artist Cecily Brown ; credited with coining the term Kitchen sink realism originally to describe a strand of post-war British painting.
Helen Szamuely (25 June 1950 – 5 April 2017), historian and Eurosceptic, researcher for the Bruges Group (United Kingdom); daughter of Lenin Boys leader, Tibor Szamuely, wrote for the BBC Russian Service, History Today,Standpoint, New Statesman, Guardian, Salisbury Review, EUobserver and Social Affairs Unit ; sister of George Szamuely.
Henri Tajfel (born Hersz Mordche; 22 June 1919 – 3 May 1982) was a Polish Jewish social psychologist and author, best known for his books and pioneering work on the cognitive aspects of prejudice and social identity theory, as well as being one of the founders of the European Association of Experimental Social Psychology. He also worked for the United Nations International Refugee Organisation.
David Toube, pro Israel, pro Zionist neoconservative activist, major contributor to Harry's Place, (leading online journal that monitors pro Palestinian sympathisers) and director of policy at Quilliam, a British think tank co-founded by Maajid Nawaz that focused on counter extremism, specifically against Islamism.
Géza Vermes,  (22 June 1924 – 8 May 2013) was a British academic, Biblical scholar, and Judaist of Hungarian Jewish descent, specialised in history of religion, particularly ancient Judaism and early Christianity; best known for his complete translation of the Dead Sea Scrolls into English.
Jackie Walker (activist), anti Zionist, anti fascist, pro Palestinian author, social critic of Israel and playwright of Sephardi Jewish and Jamaican origin.
Arnold Wesker (1932–2016), dramatist.
Rosie Whitehouse, journalist and author. Wife of Tim Judah and mother of Ben Judah; of Iraqi Jewish ancestry. Her historical research and profiles of Holocaust Survivors have been published by The Observer, The Jewish Chronicle, BBC News and Tablet magazine. Meanwhile, her writing about British government policy toward victims after the Holocaust and contemporary British antisemitism has appeared in The Independent and Haaretz.
Edgar Wind (14 May 1900 – 12 September 1971) was a German Jewish born British interdisciplinary art historian, also of Russian Jewish ancestry, specialising in iconology in the Renaissance era, member of the school of art historians associated with Aby Warburg and the Warburg Institute as well as the first Professor of art history at Oxford University, best remembered for his research in allegory and use of pagan mythology during the 15th and 16th centuries.
Naomi Wimborne-Idrissi, anti Fascist, anti-Zionist campaigner, activist and journalist who has written for Al Jazeera English, Jewish Voice for Labour, International Business Times UK focusing on Palestinian rights; anti-Corbynism and critique of the concept of the New antisemitism; holds seat on National Executive Committee of the Labour Party.
Stephen Winsten (1893–1991), one of the 'Whitechapel Boys' group of young Jewish men and future writers in London's East End in the years before World War I (the others included Isaac Rosenberg, John Rodker and Joseph Leftwich). 
Robert Winston, Baron Winston,  (born 15 July 1940) is a British professor, medical doctor, scientist, television presenter and Labour peer;has received at least twenty three  honorary degrees; author of over twenty five books.He is a member of Labour Friends of Israel; father of Ben Winston,renowned for producing a number of the annual Brit Awards from 2011 to 2014 and more recently he was a co-producer of US Grammy Awards and Tony Awards.
Humbert Wolfe CB CBE (5 January 1885 – 5 January 1940) was an Italian Jewish British poet, man of letters and translator of Heinrich Heine.
Lauri Wylie, (25 May 1880 – 28 June 1951), was a British actor and author.
Israel Zangwill (1864–1926), novelist and playwright. Zangwill was a British author at the forefront of cultural Zionism during the 19th century, and was associate of Theodor Herzl, later rejecting search for a Jewish homeland in Palestine. Father of Oliver Zangwill and husband of Suffragette Edith Ayrton.

Songwriters

Lionel Bart (1930–1999), writer and composer of pop music and musicals
Don Black (born 1938), lyricist
Ronald Cass (21 April 1923 – 2 June 2006), screenwriter, composer, playwright, novelist and music director; co-wrote the screenplays for the Cliff Richard films The Young Ones (1961) and Summer Holiday (1963).
Francis Chagrin (15 November 1905 – 10 November 1972) of Romanian Jewish ancestry, composer of film scores and orchestral music, as well as a conductor; founded the Society for the Promotion of New Music.
Jonathan Cohen (musician); pianist, composer and musical director.Ruth Inglis The window in the corner: a half-century of children's television  – 2003 – Page 51 "Jonathan did the accompaniments for Jackanory, in which a personality, usually a West End star, read a story to the children. ... Jonathan Cohen says that everyone on Play School had a cut-glass educated accent and used 'received English." Known for work on many BBC children's programmes from the 1960s to the 1990s,Play School, Playbus (latterly Playdays), Play Away, Rentaghost and Jackanory.
Murray Gold (born 28 February 1969), musical director and composer of the music for Doctor Who from 2005–2018; nominated for five BAFTAs. Was musical director for the University of Cambridge's Footlights society; nominated four times by the Royal Television Society; also wrote the BBC radio play Kafka the Musical.  
Friedrich Hollaender (18 October 1896 – 18 January 1976) was a German Jewish film soundtrack composer and author born in England; son of operetta composer Victor Hollaender, musical director at the Barnum & Bailey Circus.
Wilfred Josephs (24 July 1927 – 17 November 1997) was an English composer of Russian Jewish ancestry, composed music for The Great War (TV series), Horizon (British TV series), Swallows and Amazons (1974 film), All Creatures Great and Small (film), and The Prisoner.
Herbert Kretzmer (1925–2020), lyricist
Keith Levene, songwriter for The Flowers of Romance (British band) with Sid Vicious, The Clash, and John Lydon's Public Image; co-wrote Belsen was a Gas with Sid Vicious, a song later recorded by The Sex Pistols.
Louis Levy (20 November 1894 – 18 August 1957) was an English film music director and conductor, who worked in particular on Alfred Hitchcock and Will Hay films; head of the music department for all Gainsborough Pictures productions from 1933 onwards; in 1948, Levy became general musical director for the Associated British Picture Corporation, and during the 1950s he was head of music at Elstree Studios.
Hans May (11 July 1886 – 1 January 1959) was an Austrian Jewish born composer who went into exile in Britain in 1936 after the Nazis came to power in his homeland; scored music for the Boulting Brothers and Rank and Gainsborough Pictures.
George Michael (1963–2016), singer and songwriter (maternal grandmother)
Stanley Myers, composed Cavatina and incidental music for Doctor Who, as well as composing brass parts for Pink Floyd's final album with Syd Barrett, A Saucerful of Secrets.
Monty Norman (1928–2022), lyricist, composer and singer (creator of the "James Bond Theme")
Melanie Pappenheim (born 1959) ; English soprano and composer, notable for her vocal and composition work for the 2005 revival of Doctor Who and her contributions to soundtracks of Eyes Wide Shut and Gangs of New York.
Jocelyn Pook (born 14 February 1960); composer, and viola player; wrote scores on Theresienstadt Ghetto, Holocaust Shoah remembrance for The Jewish Music Institute as well as writing soundtracks for Eyes Wide Shut, The Merchant of Venice and The Wife; worked with post punk artists and Massive Attack.
Harry Revel (né Glaser; 21 December 1905 – 3 November 1958); composer of Russian Jewish ancestry, wrote the theme music for Love Thy Neighbour (1972 TV series), a show that dealt with ethnic conflict, Political correctness and racial tension in 1970s Britain.
David Rose (1910–1990), London born songwriter and composer; wrote music for many television series, including Little House on the Prairie, Bonanza, and Highway Patrol. Awarded four Emmys.
Mátyás Seiber (4 May 190524 September 1960) was a Hungarian Jewish British composer whose work linked many diverse musical influences, from the Hungarian tradition of Bartók and Kodály, to Schoenberg and serial music, to jazz, folk song, and lighter music.
Manning Sherwin (4 January 1902 – 26 July 1974), born in America but spent most of his career in London; worked with Vera Lynn and Eric Maschwitz (of Lithuanian Jewish ancestry) to compose A Nightingale Sang in Berkeley Square; also composed numerous soundtracks for British films in the World War Two period.
Fritz Spiegl (27 January 1926 – 23 March 2003) was an Austrian Jewish English musician, journalist, broadcaster, humourist and collector who lived and worked in Britain from 1939; wrote Theme from Z-Cars in 1962 and compiled Radio 4 UK Theme in 1978.
Mischa Spoliansky (28 December 1898 – 28 June 1985), Russian Jewish composer of cabaret and revue songs in the Weimar Republic of the 1920s and early 1930s; forced to emigrate to London in 1933 when Hitler rose to power. He stayed in Britain for the rest of his life, working as composer of film scores.
Jule Styne (1905–1994), songwriter (UK-born)
Debbie Wiseman (born 1963), composer

Classical musicians

John Barnett, composer
Julius Benedict, composer
Maria Bland, singer
John Braham (tenor)(circa|1774 – 17 February 1856) tenor opera singer born in London; one of Europe's leading opera stars. His success, and that of his offspring in marrying into the British aristocracy, are also notable examples of Jewish social mobility in the early 19th century.
Giacobbe Cervetto, popularised the cello in England, born in Italy to Italian Jewish parents 
Israel Citkowitz (6 February 1909 – 4 May 1974); composer and pianist.
Harriet Cohen, pianist
Frederic Hymen Cowen, composer
Isidore de Lara, composer
Jacqueline du Pré, cellist
Brian Elias (born 30 August 1948) is a British composer of Iraqi Jewish ancestry.
Gerald Finzi, composer
Norma Fisher, pianist
Benjamin Frankel, composer of Polish Jewish ancestry; best known pieces include a cycle of five string quartets, eight symphonies, and concertos for violin and viola; also notable for writing over 100 film scores and working as a big band arranger in the 1930s. During the last 15 years of his life, Frankel also developed his own style of 12-note composition which retained contact with tonality.
Alexander Goehr, composer; son of Walter Goehr
Walter Goehr, composer
Berthold Goldschmidt, composer
Livia Ruth Gollancz, (25 May 1920 − 28 March 2018) was the daughter of Socialist humanitarian publisher, Victor Gollancz and was the first female principal horn of a major UK symphony orchestra.
Mark Hambourg (1 June 1879 – 26 August 1960) was a Russian British concert pianist.
Myra Hess, pianist, best known for her performances of the works of Bach, Mozart, Beethoven and Schumann.
Alice Herz-Sommer (1903–2014), Czech-born Israeli-British pianist, music teacher, and supercentenarian) 
Gerard Hoffnung, tubist, illustrator and cartoonist, impresario, humorist
Steven Isserlis, cellist
Peter Jonas (director) (14 October 1946 – 22 April 2020), of Ashkenazi, Jamaican and Lebanese ancestry, CBE, FRCM, FRSA, assistant to Sir Georg Solti, music director of the Chicago Symphony Orchestra; manager of the English National Opera (1993), director of Bavarian State Opera (Staatsintendant), awarded the Bayerische Verfassungsmedaille, Fellow of the Royal Society of Arts, Knight Bachelor, Bavarian Maximilian Order for Science and Art.
Minna Keal, née Mina Nerenstein (22 March 1909 – 14 November 1999) was a British composer of Russian Jewish ancestry whose work was performed at BBC Proms, Academy, Whitechapel Gallery and Alexandra Palace; mother of highly regarded Marxist historian Raphael Samuel
Hans Keller, musicologist
Evgeny Kissin (born 10 October 1971) is a Russian Jewish concert pianist and composer.
Yaltah Menuhin
Yehudi Menuhin, Lord Menuhin of Stoke d'Abernon; conductor and violinist (American/UK-based), son of anti-Zionist campaigner Moshe Menuhin,  father of author Gerard Menuhin (born 1948 in Scotland) and pianist and composer Jeremy Menuhin, descendent of Shneur Zalman of Liadi (4 September 1745 – 15 December 1812 O.S. / 18 Elul 5505 – 24 Tevet 5573), rabbi and the founder and first Rebbe of Chabad, a branch of Hasidic Judaism.
Benno Moiseiwitsch, pianist (Russian-born; naturalized 1937)
Ignaz Moscheles (23 May 179410 March 1870) was a Bohemian piano virtuoso and composer, based in London and Leipzig. Tutor to Felix Mendelssohn.
Isaac Nathan (15 January 1864) was an English composer of Polish Jewish ancestry, musicologist and journalist, who has been called the "father of Australian music".https://reporter.anu.edu.au/father-australian-music "In fact, his reputation rests on his being considered the father of Australian music."
Michael Nyman, composer
Murray Perahia, American pianist (UK-based)
James Rhodes, pianist
Landon Ronald, conductor and composer
Robert Saxton, composer
Rudolf Schwarz, conductor
Solomon, professional name of the pianist Solomon Cutner
Sir Georg Solti, conductor
Anna Steiger (born 13 February 1960 is a British and American opera singer who has sung leading soprano and mezzo-soprano roles in British, European and North American opera houses; daughter of Rod Steiger and Clare Bloom
Walter Susskind (1913–1980), conductor
Richard Tauber, Jewish-born Roman Catholic singer and composer (naturalised British citizen, 1940)
Lionel Tertis, violist
Simon Waley Waley, musician
Fanny Waterman  (22 March 192020 December 2020), of Russian Jewish ancestry, British pianist and academic piano teacher, known as founder, chair and artistic director of the Leeds International Piano Competition, also president of the Harrogate International Music Festival.
Egon Wellesz, composer
Benjamin Zander, music director

Ballet dancers

Celia Franca, ballerina
Diana Gould (dancer), wife of Yehudi Menuhin.
Barnett Nathan (1793 – 6 December 1856), brother of Isaac Nathan, known professionally as Baron Nathan''', was an English impresario, entertainer, and dancing master of Polish Jewish ancestry. He acted for many years as master of ceremonies and managing director at Rosherville Gardens.
Peggy van Praagh, ballerina, choreographer, teacher was born in London and was of Jewish and English descent.
Marie Rambert, of Polish Jewish ancestry, joined Diaghilev’s Ballets Russes in 1912, working with the ballet legend Vaslav Nijinsky. ballerina

Other

Harold Abrahams CBE (15 December 1899 – 14 January 1978) English track and field athlete of Lithuanian Jewish and Russian Jewish ancestry, noted author and Olympic champion in 1924 in the 100 metres sprint, depicted in the 1981 film Chariots of Fire; brother of Adolphe Abrahams (1883–1967), founder of British sport medicine.
Gerhard Adler (14 April 1904 – 23 December 1988), of German Jewish ancestry, was a major figure in the world of analytical psychology who had a significant effect on popular culture in England; known for his translation into English from the original German and editorial work on the Collected Works of Carl Gustav Jung.
Jankel Adler (born Jankiel Jakub Adler; 26 July 1895 – 25 April 1949) was a Polish Jewish painter and printmaker.
Gerry Anderson, of Russian Jewish ancestry, produced Thunderbirds, Stingray, Captain Scarlet and the Mysterons and Joe 90.
Dan Arbeid, sculptor and potter.
Don Arden (born Harry Levy; 4 January 1926 – 21 July 2007), of Ashkenazi descent, manager of Gene Vincent, Black Sabbath, Small Faces and The Move; father of David Levy and Sharon Osbourne; founder of Jet Records; Jet's catalogue is owned by BMG Rights Management under its Sanctuary Records label.
Noma Bar, graphic designer, illustrator and artist; his illustrations appear internationally in newspapers, magazines, book covers and advertising campaigns, including work for Mercedes-Benz, the World Food Programme, The New Yorker, The Guardian, The New York Times, Time Out London, GQ, The Economist, Esquire, Apple, Google, Sony, Nike, Inc., IBM and Coca-Cola, V&A, the BBC, and BAFTA; also designs book covers for Don DeLillo, Haruki Murakami.
Peter Barakan, D.J. and author of Polish Jewish and Anglo-Burmese people ancestry. Brother of Michael Barakan of Byzantium (band).
Lotte Berk, dancer and health guru
J. D. Bernal  (10 May 1901 – 15 September 1971) was an Irish scientist of Sephardi ancestry who pioneered the use of X-ray crystallography in molecular biology, published on the history of science, wrote popular books on science and society; was a communist activist and a member of the Communist Party of Great Britain (CPGB); his book The World, the Flesh and the Devil called "the most brilliant attempt at scientific prediction ever made" by Arthur C. Clarke. It is famous for having been the first to propose the so-called Bernal sphere, a type of space habitat intended for permanent residence. The second chapter explores radical changes to human bodies and intelligence and the third discusses the impact of these on society.
Martin Bernal, author and leading pioneer in the creation of Pan-African studies, of Sephardi ancestry, most famous for his work Black Athena.
David Beckham, Jewish maternal grandfather, describes himself as 'half Jewish'.
Anya Berger, of Russian Jewish and Austrian Jewish ancestry, actress, wife of John Berger and contributor to Ways of Seeing, translator, intellectual, communist and feminist; cited by The Guardian as having played a part in many of the events and movements that shaped the 20th century.
John Berger, Jewish father, convert to Roman Catholicism, (5 November 1926 – 2 January 2017) was an English art critic, novelist, painter and poet. Berger's essay on art criticism Ways of Seeing, is known as a foundation text employing deconstruction and feminist prisms of epistemology and ontology, questioning axiomatic assumptions about gender, racial prejudice and Orientalism, whilst introducing and debating prisms of Psychological projection, Reification (Marxism), False Consciousness, Commodity fetishism, Marx's theory of alienation  and essentialism. He was a supporter of the Palestinian cause, and, focused on Israel and apartheid, a member of the Support Committee of the Russell Tribunal on Palestine.
Clara Birnberg (1892 or 1894–1989) was a British artist, illustrator, portraitist and sculptor of Ukrainian Jewish ancestry; married to the artist Stephen Weinstein.
Chris Blackwell, British-Jamaican, founder of Island Records, of Sephardi ancestry; one of the first people to introduce Bob Marley, Lee "Scratch" Perry, Burning Spear, Toots and the Maytals, The Heptones, Black Uhuru and Sly and Robbie to a worldwide audience outside Jamaica.
Alan Blumlein (29 June 1903 – 7 June 1942); English electronics engineer of German Jewish ancestry, notable for his many inventions in telecommunications, sound recording, stereophonic sound, television and radar; considered one of the most significant engineers and inventors of his time.
David Bohm  (20 December 1917 – 27 October 1992) was an American British scientist of Lithuanian Jewish and Hungarian Jewish ancestry and a prolific author who has been described as one of the most significant theoretical physicists of the 20th century and who contributed unorthodox ideas to quantum theory, neuropsychology and the philosophy of mind.
David Bomberg, of Polish Jewish ancestry, (5 December 1890 – 19 August 1957) was a British painter (Vorticism and Futurism), and one of the Whitechapel Boys.
Caprice Bourret, model (American-born and raised)
Gerry Bron, of Ashkenazi ancestry, producer for Vertigo Records, founder of Bronze Records, manager of Motörhead, The Damned, Uriah Heep and Hawkwind; also worked with one of Elvis Presley's songwriters Aaron Schroeder as well as singer Gene Pitney.
Carmel Budiardjo 18 June 1925 – 10 July 2021, human rights activist, anti- fascist, lecturer, and author.
Mel Calman (19 May 1931 – 10 February 1994), cartoonist of Russian Jewish ancestry best known for his "little man" cartoons published in the Daily Express (1957–63), The Sunday Telegraph (1964–65), The Observer (1965–6), The Sunday Times (1969–84) and The Times (1979–94).
Sybil Cholmondeley, Marchioness of Cholmondeley  (born Sybil Rachel Betty Cecile Sassoon; 30 January 1894 – 26 December 1989), styled Countess of Rocksavage from 1913 to 1923, was a British socialite, patron of the arts; of Iraqi Jewish Mizrahi Jewish ancestry, belonging to the prominent Sassoon and Rothschild families.
Sheila Cohen, founder (with Nigel Waymouth) of highly influential psychedelic proto punk boutique Granny Takes a Trip, remembered as the "first psychedelic boutique in Groovy London of the 1960s"  
Joseph Corré, fashion designer, environmental activist, agent provocateur, and son of Dame Vivienne Westwood and Malcolm McLaren, former manager of Sex Pistols, of Sephardi Jewish origin.
Milein Cosman (31 March 1921 – 21 November 2017); German Jewish artist best known for her drawings and prints of Francis Bacon, Mikhail Baryshnikov, T. S. Eliot and Igor Stravinsky. Wife of musicologist Hans Keller.
Mitzi Cunliffe born Mitzi Solomon (1 January 1918 – 30 December 2006); sculptor, designed golden trophy in the shape of a theatrical mask for British Academy of Film and Television Arts and be presented as the BAFTA Award.
Carl Davis,  (born 28 October 1936) is an American-born conductor and composer who has written music for more than 100 television programmes; collaborated with Paul McCartney in the creation of the Liverpool Oratorio. Composed music for The World at War, British documentary television series chronicling the events of the Second World War
David Dangoor  (born 1948) is a British businessman and philanthropist of Iraqi Jewish Mizrahi Jewish ancestry.
Cara Delevingne, model (born 1998)
Richard Desmond  (born 8 December 1951); of Ukrainian Jewish ancestry, founder of Northern & Shell, a publisher of celebrity magazines (including OK! and New!), Channel 5 (British TV channel) and Daily Express.
André Deutsch  (15 November 1917 – 11 April 2000) was a Hungarian Jewish British publisher who founded an eponymous publishing company in 1951.
Oscar Deutsch (12 August 1893 – 5 December 1941), of Hungarian Jewish ancestry, founder of Odeon Cinemas in 1928, with the flagship cinema, the Odeon, Leicester Square in London, opening in 1937; cousin of Arnold Deutsch, Soviet spy and recruiter of Kim Philby.
Dora Diamant, lover of Franz Kafka of Polish Jewish origin, joined the Communist Party and performed as an agitprop actress, later interned as enemy alien at the Port Erin Women's Detention Camp on the Isle of Man in 1940–1941. Released, she returned to London, where she helped to found the Friends of Yiddish, working to keep the Yiddish language and culture alive. She died of kidney failure in east London on 15 August 1952, and was buried in an unmarked grave in the United Synagogue Cemetery on Marlowe Road in East Ham.
Dodo, of German Jewish origin, born as Dörte Clara Wolff (10 February 1907 – 22 December 1998), was a German painter and illustrator of the New Objectivity.Arbeitskreis Bild Druck Papier – Tagungsband Berlin 2012 Konrad Vanja, Detlef Lorenz, Alberto Milano – 2013 – Page 146 "Die erste Gruppe führte Martina Krause: Ein Leben in Bildern über Dodo, die Künstlerin Dörte Clara Wolff, und die Sammlungen der Lipperheideschen Kostümbibliothek, die anderen zwei Gruppen mit Andreas Otto und Anja Birkel begaben ..."
Erica Echenberg, photographer on the early Punk Rock scene in London; worked for Sniffin' Glue producing pictures of Brian Eno, Dave Vanian, Marc Bolan,Gaye Advert, Billy Idol and The Clash.
Brian Epstein (19 September 1934 – 27 August 1967) music entrepreneur of Lithuanian Jewish and Russian Jewish ancestry; managed the Beatles from 1962 until his death in 1967.
Jacob Epstein  (10 November 1880 – 21 August 1959) was an American-British sculptor who helped pioneer modern sculpture (Vorticism and Futurism), of Polish Jewish ancestry.
Irving Finkel (born 1951), philologist and Assyriologist Keeper of Ancient Mesopotamian script, languages and cultures in the Department of the Middle East in the British Museum, specialises in cuneiform from ancient Mesopotamia.
Eva Frankfurther,(10 February 1930 – January 1959) was a German Jewish-born British artist known for her depictions of the Jamaican Windrush immigrant communities of the East End of London in the 1950s
Barnett Freedman CBE RDI (19 May 1901 – 4 January 1958) was a British painter, commercial designer, book illustrator, typographer, and lithographer of Russian Jewish ancestry.
Bella Freud, descendent of Sigmund Freud, fashion designer of Viennese Jewish ancestry, notable on the early punk rock scene in London circa 1976, having worked in Vivienne Westwood's shops and having connections to Jordan Pamela Rooke and the Bromley Contingent .
Jill Furmanovsky, of Russian Jewish ancestry; prominent in the early punk rock explosion in England, she photographed The Ramones, Bob Marley, The Clash, Soo Catwoman, Siouxsie and the Banshees and The Sex Pistols. 
Kitty Garman, (27 August 1926 – 11 January 2011), was a British artist, who, following role of the muses, was a model for her father Jacob Epstein, her first husband Lucian Freud (including Portrait of Kitty), and Andrew Tift. In 2004 she had her own show at The New Art Gallery Walsall.
Robert Gavron CBE FRSL (13 September 1930 – 7 February 2015); chairman of the Guardian Media Group and a trustee of the Scott Trust between 1997 and 2000; chairman of the Open College of the Arts (1991–1996), a director of the Royal Opera House (1992–1998), a trustee of the National Gallery (1994–2001), and of the Paul Hamlyn Foundation (1987–2005). He was a governor of the London School of Economics (1997–2002) and in 1996 Honorary Fellow of the Royal Society of Literature.
Uri Geller (born 20 December 1946 in British Mandate of Palestine Mandatory Palestine (now Israel) is an Israeli-British illusionist, magician, television personality, and self-proclaimed psychic.
Mark Gertler (artist) (9 December 1891 – 23 June 1939), born Marks Gertler, was a British painter (Vorticism, Futurism, Cubism) of figure subjects, portraits and still-life and one of the Whitechapel Boys of Polish Jewish ancestry. He was inspiration for Gilbert Cannan's novel Mendel. The characters of Loerke in D. H. Lawrence's Women in Love, and Gombauld in Aldous Huxley's Crome Yellow were based on him.
Stephen Glass, was a Hungarian Jewish photographer best known for his nude studies. With his younger brother, Zoltán Glass, he was one of a large group of talented Hungarians who fled westward before the outbreak Second World War.
Gluck (painter) was a British painter, who rejected any forename or prefix (such as ‘Miss’ or ‘Mr.’), as Gluck was gender-nonconforming. Gluck was born into Jewish family in London, England. Gluck's father was Joseph Gluckstein, whose brothers Isidore and Montague had founded J. Lyons and Co., a British coffee house and catering empire.
Walter Goehr,(28 May 19034 December 1960) was a German Jewish composer and conductor and descendent of Felix Mendelssohn and Moses Mendelssohn.
Ruth Gollancz, follower of Modernism, Avant-garde painter and wife of Victor Gollancz.
Victor Gollancz (/ɡəˈlænts/; 9 April 1893 – 8 February 1967) was a British publisher and humanitarian, supporter of left-wing causes, of German Jewish and Polish Jewish Rabbinical heritage.
Giorgio Gomelsky (28 February 1934 – 13 January 2016) filmmaker, impresario, music manager, songwriter; owned Crawdaddy Club where The Rolling Stones were house band, and he was involved with their early management; also managed The Yardbirds and Soft Machine; ran Marmalade Records.
Lucian Grainge CBE (born 29 February 1960) is the chairman and chief executive officer of Universal Music Group.
Nigel Grainge (4 October 1946 – 11 June 2017) was a British music executive, and the founder of Ensign Records in 1976; brother of Lucian Grainge.
Peter Grant (music manager) (5 April 1935 – 21 November 1995); best known as the manager of Led Zeppelin. 
 Derek Green, management, Public Relations and promotion for A&M Records.
Paul Hamlyn,  (12 February 1926 – 31 August 2001) German Jewish born British publisher and philanthropist; established Paul Hamlyn Foundation; also established Music for Pleasure (record label) as a joint venture with EMI; the Royal Opera House announced that Floral Hall atrium will be renamed Paul Hamlyn Hall in his honour .
Ruth Harrison  (24 June 1920 – 13 June 2000) was an English animal welfare activist and writer; daughter of author Stephen Winsten and artist Clara Birnberg.
Solomon Hart  (April 1806 – 11 June 1881) was a British painter and engraver. He was the first Jewish member of the Royal Academy in London and was probably the most important Jewish artist working in England in the 19th century.
Edith Tudor-Hart, Austrian Jewish British Marxist activist, photographer and spy, trained at Walter Gropius's Bauhaus, recruited the Cambridge Spy ring. 
Arnold Haskell (19 July 1903, London – 14 November 1980, Bath) was a British dance critic who founded the Camargo Society in 1930.  With Ninette de Valois, he was influential in the development of the Royal Ballet School. 
Margot Heinemann, (18 November 1913 – 10 June 1992) was a British Marxist writer, drama scholar, and leading member of the Communist Party of Great Britain (CPGB).
Rose Henriques, pianist, activist and British artist of German Jewish ancestry, and social and charity worker in the East End of London.
Andy Hobsbawm, son of Eric Hobsbawm, entrepreneur, writer and musician of Viennese Jewish ancestry.
Jonty Hurwitz(born 2 September 1969 ) British South African artist, engineer and entrepreneur. Hurwitz creates scientifically inspired artworks and anamorphic sculptures; recognised for the smallest human form ever created using nano technology. Also founder (with Errol Damelin) of Wonga.com, also known as Wonga,a payday loan firm. 
Dick James (born Leon Isaac Vapnick; 12 December 1920 – 1 February 1986, of Polish Jewish ancestry) was a British music publisher and singer. He and Brian Epstein established the Beatles' publisher Northern Songs. 
Jennifer Jankel (born May 1940), chair of the Jewish Music Institute in London; daughter of bandleader Joe Loss; of Russian Jewish ancestry.
David Joseph (executive); chairman and CEO of Universal Music UK; oversees the labels Def Jam, Island Records, Polydor, Capitol Records, Decca Records and EMI, as well as the world's most famous recording studios Abbey Road; oversees the Brit Awards and the Grenfell Foundation.
Lily Delissa Joseph, née Solomon, (24 June 1863 – 27 July 1940) was a British artist and social campaigner active in the English suffrage movement.
Gerry Judah, FRSS is a British artist and designer of Iraqi Jewish and Mizrahi Jewish ancestry who has created settings for theatre, film, television, museums and public spaces.
Princess Julia (born Julia Fodor, 8 April 1960) is an English DJ and music writer who has also been called the "first lady of London's fashion scene."
Nathan Joseph (23 July 1939 – 30 August 2005) was a British record company founder, theatrical producer and talent agent; pioneer in the development of independent record companies in the 1960s and 1970s; founder of Transatlantic Records, an independent British record company that flourished between 1961 and 1977. 
Antony Kamm, of Polish Jewish ancestry and son of George Kamm, a founder director of Pan Books and his wife Josephine, a biographer and novelist (who was a first cousin of Herbert Samuel). Kamm's wife, Anthea Bell translated Asterix and the works of Franz Kafka.
Alan Keith, of Russian Jewish ancestry, OBE (born Alexander Kossoff; 19 October 1908 – 17 March 2003) was a British actor, disc jockey and radio presenter, noted for being the longest-serving and eldest presenter on British radio by the time of his death aged 94.
Linda Keith, of Russian Jewish ancestry, (born 1946) is a former British fashion model, best known for her work for Vogue magazine during the 1960s as well as her involvement in the rock music scene; first cousin of Paul Kossoff.
Hans Keller (11 March 1919 – 6 November 1985) was a Viennese Jewish British musician and writer, who made significant contributions to musicology and music criticism; best known for his appearance on TV show The Look of the Week in which he interviewed Syd Barrett and Roger Waters. Keller was generally puzzled by, or even contemptuous of, the group and its music, opening with the comment "why has it all got to be so terribly loud?" 
Michael Korda (born 8 October 1933) is an English-born writer and novelist of Hungarian Jewish ancestry, who was editor-in-chief of Simon & Schuster in New York City.
Vincent Korda (22 June 1897 – 4 January 1979) was a Hungarian Jewish art director, later settling in Britain, and he was the younger brother of Alexander and Zoltan Korda.
Jacob Kramer (26 December 1892 – 4 February 1962) was a Ukrainian Jewish born painter who spent all of his working life in England
Clive Langer, New wave music, punk rock and post-punk sound engineer and record producer, of Polish Jewish ancestry.
Philip de László  (born Fülöp Laub;  ; 30 April 1869 – 22 November 1937) was an Anglo- Hungarian Jewish painter known particularly for his portraits of royal and aristocratic personages.
David Morris Levy and Jacques Levy; founders of Embassy Records; later taken over by Columbia Records; also founders of Oriole Records (UK).
Michael Levy, Baron Levy, (born 11 July 1944), Labour Party peer, was chairman and CEO of group of music companies, founded Magnet Records,  now consultant for a number of companies and is chairman of finance company, spent nine years as Tony Blair's special envoy to Middle East
Flora Lion (3 December 1878 – 15 May 1958), English portrait painter, known for her portraits of society figures and murals
Romek Marber (25 November 1925 – 30 March 2020) was a Polish Jewish British graphic designer and academic known for his work illustrating the covers of Penguin Books, The Economist, New Society, Town and Queen magazines, Nicholson’s London Guides, BBC Television, Columbia Pictures, the London Planetarium and others.
Albert Marchinsky, (1875 – July 1930) was a Polish Jewish stage magician.
Gered Mankowitz, rock music and fashion photographer . Son of Wolf Mankowitz, of Russian Jewish ancestry. Worked with Jimi Hendrix and Soft Machine.
Laura Marks OBE (born 26 April 1960); inter-faith social activist, policy adviser, writer and media commentator; sits on the board of the Jewish News. She is a regular media commentator, contributing to platforms including BBC Radio 2 Pause for Thought, BBC Breakfast, BBC London News, HuffPost, Evening Standard, The Jewish Chronicle, Jewish News, The Times of Israel and the Ham & High.
Enid Marx, distant cousin of Karl Marx, RDI (20 October 1902 – 18 May 1998), was an English painter and designer, best known for her industrial textile designs for the London Transport Board and the Utility furniture Scheme. Marx was the first female engraver to be designated as a Royal Designer for Industry.
Isabel Maxwell, (born 16 August 1950, daughter of Robert Maxwell) film maker for Southern Television in the UK; in 1973, Maxwell made her first film, an adaptation of the book Jonathan Livingston Seagull,  entrepreneur and the co-founder of Magellan, an early search engine, listed as a Technology Pioneer of the World Economic Forum, She served as the President of Commtouch, an Israeliinternet company that became CYREN. She was a Director of Israel Venture Network and built up their Social Entrepreneur program in Israel from 2004–2010.
Stella McCartney, daughter of Linda McCartney, who was of German Jewish and Russian Jewish ancestry.
Malcolm McLaren, of Sephardi ancestry, (22 January 1946 – 8 April 2010) was an English impresario, agent provocateur, major figure in the history and origination of punk rock, fashion designer and boutique owner, follower of the Situationist International and the Avant-garde, promoter and manager of the New York Dolls and the Sex Pistols.
Jonathan Mendelsohn, Baron Mendelsohn; spokesman and lobbyist for the gambling company PartyGaming which merged with bwin Interactive Entertainment and Bwin.Party Digital Entertainment; former chairman of Labour Friends of Israel.
Nicola Mendelsohn (née Clyne; born 29 August 1971) vice-president for Europe, the Middle East and Africa for Facebook; co-chair of the Creative Industries Council; director of the Bailey's Prize for Women's Fiction.; first female president of the Institute of Practitioners in Advertising; chairman of the corporate board of Women's Aid, president of the Women's Advertising Club of London.; serves on the UK government’s Digital Economy Council, the Mayor of London’s Business Advisory Board, and is co-president of the charity Norwood
Daniel Mendoza (5 July 1764 – 3 September 1836); renowned English prizefighter, who became the 18th boxing champion of England from 1792–1795; of Sephardic or Portuguese Jewish descent.The Jewish Boxer's Hall of Fame, Blady, Ken, (1988) Shapolsky Publishers, Inc., New York, NY, pp. 6–15
Bernard Meninsky, (25 July 1891 – 12 February 1950), Ukrainian Jewish abstract artist and Avant-garde theorist.
Hephzibah Menuhin, descendent of Shneur Zalman of Liadi, sister of Yehudi Menuhin, daughter of pro Palestinian anti Zionist activist Moshe Menuhin, author, musician, social activist, President of the British chapter of the Women's International League for Peace and Freedom. 
Oliver Messel, (13 January 1904 – 13 July 1978) was an English artist of German Jewish ancestry and one of the foremost stage designers of the 20th century.
Gustav Metzger (10 April 1926, Nuremberg – 1 March 2017, London), exponent of performance art, collaborator with Fluxus, art tutor to Pete Townshend, leading exponent of Auto-Destructive Art and the Art Strike, of Polish Jewish origin. 
Tanya Moiseiwitsch,  (3 December 1914 – 19 February 2003) was an English theatre designer pf Russian Jewish ancestry and daughter of Benno Moiseiwitsch.
Felix Moscheles (8 February 1833 – 22 December 1917) was an English painter, writer, peace activist, president of the International Arbitration and Peace Association. Of German Jewish ancestry. 
Stirling Moss  (17 September 1929 – 12 April 2020) was a British Formula One racing driver (Family name was originally Moses, changed to Moss). 
Maud Nelke; 7 November 189127 May 1982) was a British socialite and art patron, who aided Jewish relatives in their escape from Nazi Germany during the 1930s.
Oscar Nemon, sculptor famed for his busts of Sigmund Freud and Winston Churchill, of Austrian Jewish and Hungarian Jewish origin; father of Falcon Stuart, fashion photographer for Vogue (magazine) and Harper's Bazaar, punk rock clothes retailer, filmmaker, manager and music producer associated with X-Ray Spex, and Adam and the Ants. 
Otto Neurath (10 December 1882 – 22 December 1945) was an Austrian Jewish philosopher of science, sociologist, and political economist; inventor of the ISOTYPE method of pictorial statistics and an innovator in museum practice. Before he fled his native country in 1934, Neurath was one of the leading figures of the Vienna Circle.
Maurice Oberstein (26 September 1928—13 August 2001) was a British American music business executive; credited as "one of the chief architects of the modern UK record industry"; instrumental figure in early UK Punk Rock; promoted The Clash and Adam and The Ants.
Andrew Loog Oldham (born 29 January 1944) British Australian Jewish record producer, talent manager, impresario and author; manager and producer of the Rolling Stones from 1963 to 1967; also worked with Jimmy Page and Nico.
Sharon Osbourne née Levy, daughter of Don Arden of Ashkenazi descent, music manager and wife of Black Sabbath vocalist, Ozzy Osbourne.
Larry Parnes (3 September 1929 – 4 August 1989); music manager and impresario; seen as the first major British rock manager, and managed the most successful British rock and roll singers of late 1950s and early 1960s.
Phyllis Pearsall MBE (25 September 1906 – 28 August 1996) was a British painter and writer who founded the Geographers' A-Z Map Company, for which she is regarded as one of the most successful business people of the twentieth century; of Hungarian Jewish ancestry.
Manfred Reiss, of Polish Jewish ancestry, exponent of British Avant-garde modernism, and, rooted in Vorticism, Cubism and Abstract art, pursued a highly successful career in Graphic Design and in the late forties and early fifties, he was one of the most prolific British poster designers.
David and Simon Reuben; of Iraqi Jewish ancestry;named as the second richest family in the UK by the Sunday Times Rich List with a net worth of £16 billion. Involved in sports management related to takeover of Newcastle United and Arena Racing Company.
Martha Richler (born 11 October 1964) is an art historian and cartoonist. Working for the Evening Standard, she was the first woman to produce a daily cartoon for the newspapers based in London, known collectively as "Fleet Street". Her father is the writer Mordecai Richler. She now works as an editorial cartoonist for The Jewish Chronicle.
Fermin Rocker (22 December 1907 – 18 October 2004) was a British painter and book illustrator. He was the son of the anarcho-syndicalist theorist and activist Rudolf Rocker, a German, who had moved to London 1895, and Milly Witkop, a Ukrainian Jew and anarchist and feminist activist, who had fled to London in 1894.
Bernard Rhodes, agent provocateur, Praxis (process) and Détournement seditionary Avant-Garde fashion designer for Vivienne Westwood and Malcolm McLaren, manager of Subway Sect, The Clash, Twenty Flight Rockers and integral to the development of the punk rock scene in England from the mid 1970s and of Russian Jewish origin.
Zandra Rhodes, fashion designer.
Jake Riviera, founder of early punk rock record label, Stiff Records.
William Rothenstein, painter, designer, Avant-garde theorist, Rothenstein was knighted in the New Year Honours in 1931. Rabindranath Tagore dedicated his Nobel Prize winner poetry collection Gitanjali to William Rothenstein.
Maurice Saatchi, Baron Saatchi, of Iraqi Jewish Mizrahi Jewish ancestry; with his brother, Charles, co-founder of the advertising agencies Saatchi & Saatchi and M&C Saatchi.
Philip Sallon is a British club promoter, fashion designer and style innovator on the early British punk rock scene in 1976, of Polish Jewish ancestry. Son of renowned cartoonist and satirist Ralph Sallon.
Ralph Sallon (1899–1999), noted cartoonist and political satirist of Polish Jewish ancestry and father of Philip Sallon. Winston Churchill had Sallon's satirical drawings of Hitler copied and airdropped over Germany and occupied Europe.
Adrian Sassoon (born February 1961) is an English art dealer of Iraqi Jewish ancestry, art collector and writer.; schooled at Eton College, taught ceramics by Gordon Baldwin; studied at Christie’s Education.; curator at the J. Paul Getty Museum.
Vidal Sassoon CBE (17 January 1928 – 9 May 2012), hairstylist, businessman, philanthropist; repopularised the bob cut worn by famous fashion designers including Mary Quant; appointed CBE by Queen Elizabeth II at Buckingham Palace; selected by artist Sir Peter Blake to appear in new version of his artwork, The Beatles' Sgt. Pepper's Lonely Hearts Club Band album cover to celebrate the British cultural figures of the last six decades; founded Vidal Sassoon International Center for the Study of Antisemitism at Hebrew University of Jerusalem,devoted to gathering information about antisemitism worldwide; member of the 43 Group and Palmach and fought in the 1948 Arab–Israeli War.
Ian Saville (born 1953), magician
James Schneider (born 17 June 1987), is the co-founder of the left wing grassroots movement Momentum. In October 2016 he was appointed as a PR advisor to the leader of the Labour Party, Jeremy Corbyn, taking the role of Director of Strategic Communications. 
Isaac Shoenberg, (1 March 1880 – 25 January 1963) of Russian Jewish ancestry; best known for his role in the history of television; head of the EMI research team that developed the 405-line (Marconi-EMI system), the first fully electronic television system. 
Nicholas Serota,  (born 27 April 1946) is an English art historian and curator, who served as the Director of the Tate; currently Chair of Arts Council England.
Oda Slobodskaya (28 November/10 December 1888 – 30 July 1970) was a Russian Jewish soprano who became a British citizen.
Rebecca Solomon (London 26 September 1832 – 20 November 1886 London) was a 19th-century English draftsman, illustrator, engraver, and painter of social injustices.
Yolanda Sonnabend (26 March 1935 – 9 November 2015) was a British theatre and ballet designer and painter, primarily of portraits, of Russian Jewish ancestry.
Falcon Stuart, British photographer for Vogue (magazine) and Harper's Bazaar, punk rock clothes retailer, filmmaker, manager and music producer associated with X-Ray Spex, and Adam and the Ants. Son of sculptor Oscar Nemon, of Austrian Jewish and Hungarian Jewish origin.
Anya Teixeira (1913–1992) was a Russian Jewish British street photographer and photojournalist. Her work is held in the collection of the Victoria and Albert Museum, London.
Geoff Travis, founder of Rough Trade Records, of Ukrainian Jewish and Romanian Jewish origin. 
Monica van der Zyl (27 April 1935 – 6 March 2021) was a German Jewish actress based in the United Kingdom, known for her dubbing work on the James Bond film franchise; mother of Marie van der Zyl (née Kaye; born November 1965), who is the 48th President of the Board of Deputies of British Jews.
Minnie Weisz, photographer and visual artist of Hungarian Jewish ancestry.
Milly Witkop (-Rocker), (3 March 187723 November 1955) was a Ukrainian-born Jewish anarcho-syndicalist, feminist writer and activist. She was the common-law wife of the prominent anarcho-syndicalist leader Rudolf Rocker. The couple's son, Fermin Rocker, was an artist.
 John Woolf, rap and Grime (music genre) CEO, promotor and founder of "A-List Management", the record label that  Wiley (musician) released his music on.
Michael Zilkha (born 1954) is a British-born entrepreneur, the co-founder of ZE Records; of Iraqi Jewish ancestry and son of Selim Zilkha and grandson of Khedouri Zilkha.

 See also 
 Lists of Jews
 List of British Jews

 Notes 

 References 

JYB = Jewish Year BookTimesAd: The Times'', 6/7/06 p34: "A Call by Jews in Britain" (advert signed by 300 British Jews)

External links 
 Jinfo

Lists of British Jews